= List of triangle topics =

This list of triangle topics includes things related to the geometric shape, either abstractly, as in idealizations studied by geometers, or in triangular arrays such as Pascal's triangle or triangular matrices, or concretely in physical space. It does not include metaphors like love triangle in which the word has no reference to the geometric shape.

== Geometry ==
- Triangle
- Acute and obtuse triangles
- Altitude (triangle)
- Area bisector of a triangle
- Angle bisector of a triangle
- Angle bisector theorem
- Apollonius point
- Apollonius' theorem
- Automedian triangle
- Barrow's inequality
- Barycentric coordinates (mathematics)
- Bernoulli's quadrisection problem
- Brocard circle
- Brocard points
- Brocard triangle
- Carnot's theorem (conics)
- Carnot's theorem (inradius, circumradius)
- Carnot's theorem (perpendiculars)
- Catalogue of Triangle Cubics
- Centroid
- Ceva's theorem
- Cevian
- Circumconic and inconic
- Circumscribed circle
- Clawson point
- Cleaver (geometry)
- Congruence (geometry)
- Congruent isoscelizers point
- Contact triangle
- Conway triangle notation
- CPCTC
- Delaunay triangulation
- de Longchamps point
- Desargues' theorem
- Droz-Farny line theorem
- Encyclopedia of Triangle Centers
- Equal incircles theorem
- Equal parallelians point
- Equidissection
- Equilateral triangle
- Euler's line
- Euler's theorem in geometry
- Erdős–Mordell inequality
- Exeter point
- Exterior angle theorem
- Fagnano's problem
- Fermat point
- Fermat's right triangle theorem
- Fuhrmann circle
- Fuhrmann triangle
- Geometric mean theorem
- GEOS circle
- Gergonne point
- Golden triangle (mathematics)
- Gossard perspector
- Hadwiger–Finsler inequality
- Heilbronn triangle problem
- Heptagonal triangle
- Heronian triangle
- Heron's formula
- Hofstadter points
- Hyperbolic triangle (non-Euclidean geometry)
- Hypotenuse
- Incircle and excircles of a triangle
- Inellipse
- Integer triangle
- Isodynamic point
- Isogonal conjugate
- Isoperimetric point
- Isosceles triangle
- Isosceles triangle theorem
- Isotomic conjugate
- Isotomic lines
- Jacobi point
- Japanese theorem for concyclic polygons
- Johnson circles
- Kepler triangle
- Kobon triangle problem
- Kosnita's theorem
- Leg (geometry)
- Lemoine's problem
- Lester's theorem
- List of triangle inequalities
- Mandart inellipse
- Maxwell's theorem (geometry)
- Medial triangle
- Median (geometry)
- Menelaus' theorem
- Miquel's theorem
- Mittenpunkt
- Modern triangle geometry
- Monsky's theorem
- Morley centers
- Morley triangle
- Morley's trisector theorem
- Musselman's theorem
- Nagel point
- Napoleon points
- Napoleon's theorem
- Nine-point circle
- Nine-point hyperbola
- One-seventh area triangle
- Orthocenter
- Orthocentric system
- Orthocentroidal circle
- Orthopole
- Pappus' area theorem
- Parry point
- Pedal triangle
- Perimeter bisector of a triangle
- Perpendicular bisectors of triangle sides
- Polar circle (geometry)
- Pompeiu's theorem
- Pons asinorum
- Pythagorean theorem
  - Inverse Pythagorean theorem
- Reuleaux triangle
- Regiomontanus
- Regiomontanus' angle maximization problem
- Reuschle's theorem
- Right triangle
- Routh's theorem
- Scalene triangle
- Schwarz triangle
- Schiffler's theorem
- Sierpinski triangle (fractal geometry)
- Similarity (geometry)
- Similarity system of triangles
- Simson line
- Special right triangles
- Spieker center
- Spieker circle
- Spiral of Theodorus
- Splitter (geometry)
- Steiner circumellipse
- Steiner inellipse
- Steiner–Lehmus theorem
- Stewart's theorem
- Steiner point
- Symmedian
- Tangential triangle
- Tarry point
- Ternary plot
- Thales' theorem
- Thomson cubic
- Triangle center
- Triangle conic
- Triangle group
- Triangle inequality
- Triangular bipyramid
- Triangular prism
- Triangular pyramid
- Triangular tiling
- Triangulation
- Trilinear coordinates
- Trilinear polarity
- Trisected perimeter point
- Viviani's theorem
- Yff center of congruence

=== Trigonometry ===
- Differentiation of trigonometric functions
- Exact trigonometric constants
- History of trigonometry
- Inverse trigonometric functions
- Law of cosines
- Law of cotangents
- Law of sines
- Law of tangents
- List of integrals of inverse trigonometric functions
- List of integrals of trigonometric functions
- List of trigonometric identities
- Mollweide's formula
- Outline of trigonometry
- Rational trigonometry
- Sine
- Solution of triangles
- Spherical trigonometry
- Trigonometric functions
- Trigonometric substitution
- Trigonometric tables
- Trigonometry
- Uses of trigonometry

=== Applied mathematics ===
- De Finetti diagram
- Triangle mesh
- Nonobtuse mesh

=== Resources ===
- Encyclopedia of Triangle Centers
- Pythagorean Triangles
- The Secrets of Triangles

== Algebra ==
- Triangular matrix
- (2,3,7) triangle group

== Number theory ==
=== Triangular arrays of numbers ===
- Bell numbers
- Boustrophedon transform
- Eulerian number
- Floyd's triangle
- Lozanić's triangle
- Narayana number
- Pascal's triangle
- Rencontres numbers
- Romberg's method
- Stirling numbers of the first kind
- Stirling numbers of the second kind
- Triangular number
- Triangular pyramidal number

The (incomplete) Bell polynomials from a triangular array of polynomials (see also Polynomial sequence).

=== Integers in triangle geometry ===
- Heronian triangle
- Integer triangle
- Pythagorean triple
- Eisenstein triple

== Geography ==
- Bermuda Triangle
- Historic Triangle
- Lithium Triangle
- Parliamentary Triangle, Canberra
- Research Triangle
- Sunni Triangle
- Triangular trade
- Rhubarb Triangle

== Anatomy ==
- Submandibular triangle
- Triangle choke
- Arm triangle choke
- Submental triangle
- Carotid triangle
- Clavipectoral triangle
- Inguinal triangle
- Codman triangle

== Artifacts ==
- Black triangle
- Triangle (musical instrument)
- Triangular prism (optics)
- Triquetra

== Symbols ==
- Eye of Providence
- Valknut
- Shield of the Trinity
