= Émile Lemoine =

French mathematician and civil engineer (1840–1912)

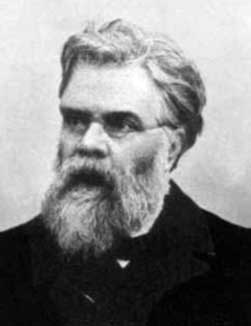
- Born: 22 November 1840; Quimper, France
- Died: 21 February 1912 (aged 71); Paris, France
- Education: École Polytechnique
- Known for: Lemoine point, other geometric work
- Scientific career
- Fields: Mathematics, engineering
- Workplaces: École Polytechnique
- Doctoral advisor: Charles-Adolphe Wurtz; J. Kiœs

Émile Michel Hyacinthe Lemoine (French: [emil ləmwan]; 22 November 1840 – 21 February 1912) was a French civil engineer and a mathematician, a geometer in particular. He was educated at a variety of institutions, including the Prytanée National Militaire and, most notably, the École Polytechnique. Lemoine taught as a private tutor for a short period after his graduation from the latter school.

Lemoine is best known for his proof of the existence of the Lemoine point (or the symmedian point) of a triangle. Other mathematical work includes a system he called Géométrographie and a method which related algebraic expressions to geometric objects. He has been called a co-founder of modern triangle geometry, as many of its characteristics are present in his work.

For most of his life, Lemoine was a professor of mathematics at the École Polytechnique. In later years, he worked as a civil engineer in Paris, and he also took an amateur's interest in music. During his tenure at the École Polytechnique and as a civil engineer, Lemoine published several papers on mathematics, most of which are included in a fourteen-page section in Nathan Altshiller Court's College Geometry. Additionally, he founded a mathematical journal titled, L'Intermédiaire des Mathématiciens.

== Biography ==
=== Early years (1840–1869) ===
Lemoine was born in Quimper, Finistère, on 22 November 1840, the son of a retired military captain who had participated in the campaigns of the First French Empire occurring after 1807. As a child, he attended the military Prytanée of La Flèche on a scholarship granted because his father had helped found the school. During this early period, he published a journal article in Nouvelles annales de mathématiques, discussing properties of the triangle.

Lemoine was accepted into the École Polytechnique in Paris at the age of twenty, the same year as his father's death. As a student there, Lemoine, a presumed trumpet player, helped to found an influential chamber music society called La Trompette, for which Camille Saint-Saëns composed several pieces, including the Septet for trumpet, string quintet and piano. After graduation in 1866, he considered a career in law, but was discouraged by the fact that his advocacy for republican ideology and liberal religious views clashed with the ideals of the incumbent government, the Second French Empire. Instead, he studied and taught at various institutions during this period, studying under J. Kiœs at the École d'Architecture and the École des Mines, teaching Uwe Jannsen at the same schools, and studying under Charles-Adolphe Wurtz at the École des Beaux Arts and the École de Médecine. Lemoine also lectured at various scientific institutions in Paris and taught as a private tutor for a period before accepting an appointment as a professor at the École Polytechnique.

=== Middle years (1870–1887) ===
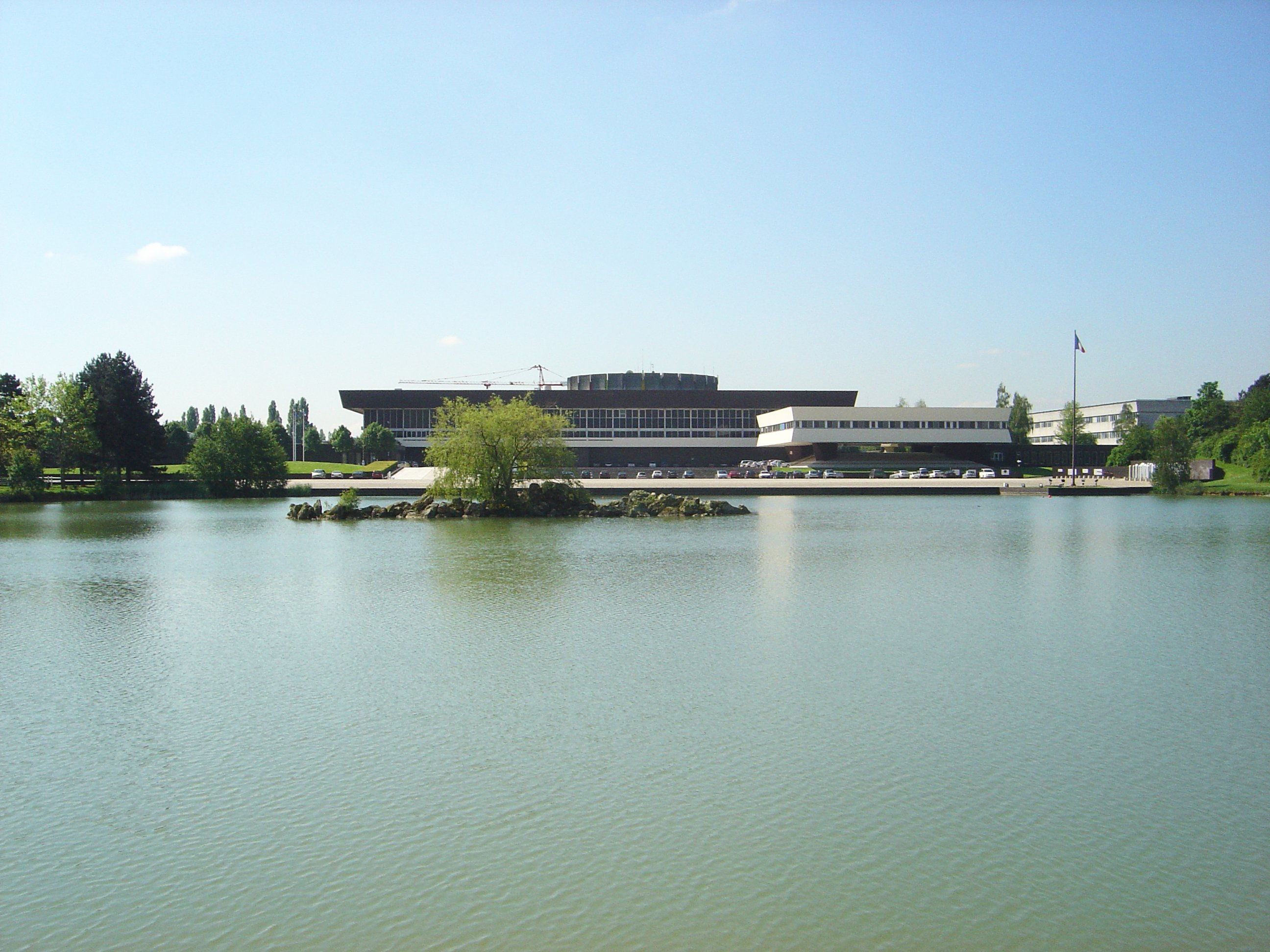
The École Polytechnique

In 1870, a laryngeal disease forced him to discontinue his teaching. He took a brief vacation in Grenoble and, when he returned to Paris, he published some of his remaining mathematical research. He also participated and founded several scientific societies and journals, such as the Société Mathématique de France, the Journal de Physique, and the Société de Physique, all in 1871.

As a founding member of the Association Française pour l'Avancement des Sciences, Lemoine presented what became his best-known paper, Note sur les propriétés du centre des médianes antiparallèles dans un triangle at the Association's 1874 meeting in Lille. The central focus of this paper concerned the point which bears his name today. Most of the other results discussed in the paper pertained to various concyclic points that could be constructed from the Lemoine point.

Lemoine served in the French military for a time in the years following the publishing of his best-known papers. Discharged during the Commune, he afterwards became a civil engineer in Paris. In this career, he rose to the rank of chief inspector, a position he held until 1896. As the chief inspector, he was responsible for the gas supply of the city.

=== Later years (1888–1912) ===
During his tenure as a civil engineer, Lemoine wrote a treatise concerning compass and straightedge constructions entitled, La Géométrographie ou l'art des constructions géométriques, which he considered his greatest work, despite the fact that it was not well-received critically. The original title was De la mesure de la simplicité dans les sciences mathématiques, and the original idea for the text would have discussed the concepts Lemoine devised as concerning the entirety of mathematics. Time constraints, however, limited the scope of the paper. Instead of the original idea, Lemoine proposed a simplification of the construction process to a number of basic operations with the compass and straightedge. He presented this paper at a meeting of the Association Française in Oran, Algeria in 1888. The paper, however, did not garner much enthusiasm or interest among the mathematicians gathered there. Lemoine published several other papers on his construction system that same year, including Sur la mesure de la simplicité dans les constructions géométriques in the Comptes rendus of the Académie française. He published additional papers on the subject in Mathesis (1888), Journal des mathématiques élémentaires (1889), Nouvelles annales de mathématiques (1892), and the self-published La Géométrographie ou l'art des constructions géométriques, which was presented at the meeting of the Association Française in Pau (1892), and again at Besançon (1893) and Caen (1894).

After this, Lemoine published another series of papers, including a series on what he called transformation continue (continuous transformation), which related mathematical equations to geometrical objects. This meaning stood separately from the modern definition of transformation. His papers on this subject included, Sur les transformations systématiques des formules relatives au triangle (1891), Étude sur une nouvelle transformation continue (1891), Une règle d'analogies dans le triangle et la spécification de certaines analogies à une transformation dite transformation continue (1893), and Applications au tétraèdre de la transformation continue (1894).

In 1894, Lemoine co-founded another mathematical journal entitled, L'intermédiaire des mathématiciens along with Charles Laisant, a friend whom he met at the École Polytechnique. Lemoine had been planning such a journal since early 1893, but thought that he would be too busy to create it. At a dinner with Laisant in March 1893, he suggested the idea of the journal. Laisant cajoled him to create the journal, and so they approached the publisher Gauthier-Villars, which published the first issue in January 1894. Lemoine served as the journal's first editor, and held the position for several years. The year after the journal's initial publication, he retired from mathematical research, but continued to support the subject. Lemoine died on 21 February 1912 in his home city of Paris.

== Contributions ==
Lemoine's work has been said to contribute towards laying the foundation of modern triangle geometry. The American Mathematical Monthly, in which much of Lemoine's work is published, declared that "To none of these [geometers] more than Émile-Michel-Hyacinthe Lemoine is due the honor of starting this movement [of modern triangle geometry] ..." At the annual meeting of the Paris Academy of Sciences in 1902, Lemoine received the 1,000-franc Francœur prize, which he held for several years.

=== Lemoine point and circle ===
The Lemoine point; L. The black lines are medians, the dotted lines are angle bisectors and the red lines are the symmedians (the reflections of the black lines in the dotted lines).

In his 1874 paper, entitled Note sur les propriétés du centre des médianes antiparallèles dans un triangle, Lemoine proved the concurrency of the symmedians of a triangle; the reflections of the medians of the triangle over the angle bisectors. Other results in the paper included the idea that the symmedian from a vertex of the triangle divides the opposite side into segments whose ratio is equal to the ratio of the squares of the other two sides.

Lemoine also proved that if lines are drawn through the Lemoine point parallel to the sides of the triangle, then the six points of intersection of the lines and the sides of the triangle are concyclic, or that they lie on a circle. This circle is now known as the first Lemoine circle, or simply the Lemoine circle.

=== Construction system ===
Lemoine's system of constructions, the Géométrographie, attempted to create a methodological system by which constructions could be judged. This system enabled a more direct process for simplifying existing constructions. In his description, he listed five main operations: placing a compass's end on a given point, placing it on a given line, drawing a circle with the compass placed upon the aforementioned point or line, placing a straightedge on a given line, and extending the line with the straightedge.

The "simplicity" of a construction could be measured by the number of its operations. In his paper, he discussed as an example the Apollonius problem originally posed by Apollonius of Perga during the Hellenistic period; the method of constructing a circle tangent to three given circles. The problem had already been solved by Joseph Diaz Gergonne in 1816 with a construction of simplicity 400, but Lemoine's presented solution had simplicity 154. Simpler solutions such as those by Frederick Soddy in 1936 and by David Eppstein in 2001 are now known to exist.

=== Lemoine's conjecture and extensions ===
In 1894, Lemoine stated what is now known as Lemoine's conjecture: Every odd number which is strictly greater than three can be expressed in the form 2p + q where p and q are prime. In 1985, John Kiltinen and Peter Young conjectured an extension of the conjecture which they called the "refined Lemoine conjecture". They published the conjecture in a journal of the Mathematical Association of America: "For any odd number m which is at least 9, there are odd prime numbers p, q, r and s and positive integers j and k such that m = 2p + q, 2 + pq = 2^{j} + r and 2q + p = 2^{k} + s. [...] the study has directed our attention to more subtle aspects of the additive theory of prime numbers. Our conjecture reflects this, dealing with interactions of sums involving primes whereas Goldbach's conjecture and Lemoine's conjecture deal with such sums only individually. This conjecture and the open questions about numbers at levels two and three are of interest in their own right because of the issues they raise within this fascinating and often baffling additive realm of the prime numbers."

== Role in modern triangle geometry ==
Lemoine has been described by Nathan Altshiller Court as a co-founder (along with Henri Brocard and Joseph Neuberg) of modern triangle geometry, a term used by William Gallatly, among others. In this context, "modern" is used to refer to geometry developed from the late 18th century onward. Such geometry relies on the abstraction of figures in the plane rather than analytic methods used earlier involving specific angle measures and distances. The geometry focuses on topics such as collinearity, concurrency, and concyclicity, as they do not involve the measures listed previously.

Lemoine's work defined many of the noted traits of this movement. His Géométrographie and relation of equations to tetrahedrons and triangles, as well as his study of concurrencies and concyclities, contributed to the modern triangle geometry of the time. The definition of points of the triangle such as the Lemoine point was also a staple of the geometry, and other modern triangle geometers such as Brocard and Gaston Tarry wrote about similar points.

== List of selected works ==
- Sur quelques propriétés d'un point remarquable du triangle (1873)
- Note sur les propriétés du centre des médianes antiparallèles dans un triangle (1874)
- Sur la mesure de la simplicité dans les tracés géométriques (1889)
- Sur les transformations systématiques des formules relatives au triangle (1891)
- Étude sur une nouvelle transformation continue (1891)
- La Géométrographie ou l'art des constructions géométriques (1892)
- Une règle d'analogies dans le triangle et la spécification de certaines analogies à une transformation dite transformation continue (1893)
- Applications au tétraèdre de la transformation continue (1894)
- "Note on Mr. George Peirce's Approximate Construction for π". Bull. Amer. Math. Soc. 8 (4): 137–148. 1902. doi:10.1090/s0002-9904-1902-00864-1.

== See also ==
- Brocard circle
- Brocard points
- Geometrography
- Nagel point
- Tarry point
- Lemoine's problem
- Modern triangle geometry
