= Brocard =

Brocard can refer to:

- Brocard (law)
- Henri Brocard, a nineteenth-century mathematician, and these geometrical entities he discovered:
  - Brocard points
  - Brocard triangle
  - Brocard circle
- Saint Brocard, first of the priors of the Carmelite Order according to oral tradition
