= Steiner point (triangle) =

Type of triangle center

In triangle geometry, the Steiner point is a particular point associated with a triangle. It is a triangle center and it is designated as the center X(99) in Clark Kimberling's Encyclopedia of Triangle Centers. Jakob Steiner (1796–1863), Swiss mathematician, described this point in 1826. The point was given Steiner's name by Joseph Neuberg in 1886.

== Definition ==
Construction of the Steiner point. Triangle ABC Triangle A'B'C' (Brocard triangle of ABC) Circumcircle of triangle ABC, centered at O Brocard circle of triangle ABC Lines concurring at the Steiner point: L_{A}: line through A parallel to B'C' L_{B}: line through B parallel to C'A' L_{C}: line through C parallel to A'B'

The Steiner point is defined as follows. (This is not the way in which Steiner defined it.)

Let ABC be any given triangle. Let O be the circumcenter and K be the symmedian point of triangle ABC. The circle with OK as diameter is the Brocard circle of triangle ABC. The line through O perpendicular to the line BC intersects the Brocard circle at another point A'. The line through O perpendicular to the line CA intersects the Brocard circle at another point B'. The line through O perpendicular to the line AB intersects the Brocard circle at another point C'. (The triangle A'B'C' is the Brocard triangle of triangle ABC.) Let L_{A} be the line through A parallel to the line B'C', L_{B} be the line through B parallel to the line C'A' and L_{C} be the line through C parallel to the line A'B'. Then the three lines L_{A}, L_{B} and L_{C} are concurrent. The point of concurrency is the Steiner point of triangle ABC.

In the Encyclopedia of Triangle Centers the Steiner point is defined as follows:

Alternative construction of the Steiner point

Let ABC be any given triangle. Let O be the circumcenter and K be the symmedian point of triangle ABC. Let l_{A} be the reflection of the line OK in the line BC, l_{B} be the reflection of the line OK in the line CA and l_{C} be the reflection of the line OK in the line AB. Let the lines l_{B} and l_{C} intersect at A″, the lines l_{C} and l_{A} intersect at B″ and the lines l_{A} and l_{B} intersect at C″. Then the lines AA″, BB″ and CC″ are concurrent. The point of concurrency is the Steiner point of triangle ABC.

== Trilinear coordinates ==
The trilinear coordinates of the Steiner point are given below.

$bc / (b^2 - c^2) : ca / (c^2 - a^2) : ab / (a^2 - b^2)$
$= b^2 c^2 \csc(b - C) : c^2 a^2 \csc(c - a) : a^2 b^2 \csc(a - b)$

== Properties ==
1. The Steiner circumellipse of triangle ABC, also called the Steiner ellipse, is the ellipse of least area that passes through the vertices A, B and C. The Steiner point of triangle ABC lies on the Steiner circumellipse of triangle ABC.
2. The Simson line of the Steiner point of triangle ABC is parallel to the Brocard axis, the line OK where O is the circumcenter and K is the symmmedian point of triangle ABC.
3. The Steiner point of the Brocard triangle is the symmedian point of ABC. The Tarry point (see below) of the Brocard triangle is the circumcenter of ABC.
4. The Steiner point of triangle ABC is the Brianchon point of the Kiepert parabola with respect to triangle ABC.
5. The Steiner point of the medial triangle of ABC is the center of the Kiepert hyperbola of triangle ABC.

=== Misconception ===
Canadian mathematician Ross Honsberger stated the following as a property of Steiner point: The Steiner point of a triangle is the center of mass of the system obtained by suspending at each vertex a mass equal to the magnitude of the exterior angle at that vertex. The center of mass of such a system is in fact not the Steiner point, but the Steiner curvature centroid, which has the trilinear coordinates $\left(\frac{\pi - A}{a} : \frac{\pi - B}{b} : \frac{\pi - C}{c}\right)$. It is the triangle center designated as X(1115) in Encyclopedia of Triangle Centers.

== Tarry point ==
The line through A perpendicular to B'C', the line through B perpendicular to C'A', and the line through C perpendicular to A'B' concur at the Tarry point.

The Tarry point of a triangle is closely related to the Steiner point of the triangle. Let ABC be any given triangle. The point on the circumcircle of triangle ABC diametrically opposite to the Steiner point of triangle ABC is called the Tarry point of triangle ABC. The Tarry point is a triangle center and it is designated as the center X(98) in Encyclopedia of Triangle Centers. The trilinear coordinates of the Tarry point are given below:

$\sec(A + \omega) : \sec(B + \omega) : \sec(C + \omega) = f(a,b,c) : f(b,c,a) : f(c,a,b)$

where ω is the Brocard angle of triangle ABC
and $f(a,b,c) = \frac{bc}{b^4 + c^4 - a^2 b^2 - a^2 c^2}$

Similar to the definition of the Steiner point, the Tarry point can be defined as follows:

Let ABC be any given triangle. Let A'B'C' be the Brocard triangle of triangle ABC. Let L_{A} be the line through A perpendicular to the line B'C', L_{B} be the line through B perpendicular to the line C'A' and L_{C} be the line through C perpendicular to the line A'B'. Then the three lines L_{A}, L_{B} and L_{C} are concurrent. The point of concurrency is the Tarry point of triangle ABC.
