= Perpendicular bisector construction =

Perpendicular bisector construction can refer to:

- Bisection § Line segment bisector, on the construction of the perpendicular bisector of a line segment
- Perpendicular bisector construction of a quadrilateral, on the use of perpendicular bisectors of a quadrilateral's sides to form another quadrilateral
