= Henri Brocard =

French meteorologist and mathematician (1845–1922)

Pierre René Jean Baptiste Henri Brocard
- Born: 12 May 1845; Vignot, Meuse
- Died: 16 January 1922 (aged 76); Kensington, London, United Kingdom
- Education: École Polytechnique
- Known for: Meteorology; Brocard points Brocard triangle Brocard circle Brocard's conjecture Brocard's problem
- Awards: Ordre des Palmes Académiques; Officer of the Légion d'honneur
- Scientific career
- Fields: Mathematics, Meteorology
- Workplaces: Military engineer, French army

Pierre René Jean Baptiste Henri Brocard (French pronunciation: [pjɛʁ ʁəne ʒɑ̃ batist ɑ̃ʁi bʁɔkaʁ]; 12 May 1845 – 16 January 1922) was a French meteorologist and mathematician, in particular a geometer. His best-known achievement is the invention and discovery of the properties of the Brocard points, the Brocard circle, and the Brocard triangle, all bearing his name.

Contemporary mathematician Nathan Court wrote that he, along with Émile Lemoine and Joseph Neuberg, was one of the three co-founders of modern triangle geometry. He was awarded the Ordre des Palmes Académiques, and was an officer of the Légion d'honneur.

He spent most of his life studying meteorology as an officer in the French Navy, but seems to have made no notable original contributions to the subject.

== Biography ==
=== Early years ===
Pierre René Jean Baptiste Henri Brocard was born on 12 May 1845, in Vignot, Meuse to Elizabeth Auguste Liouville and Jean Sebastien Brocard. He attended the Lycée in Marseille as a young child, and then the Lycée in Strasbourg. After graduating from the Lycée he entered the Academy in Strasbourg where he was prepared for the examination for entrance to the prestigious École Polytechnique in Paris, to which he was accepted in 1865.

==== École Polytechnique and military years ====
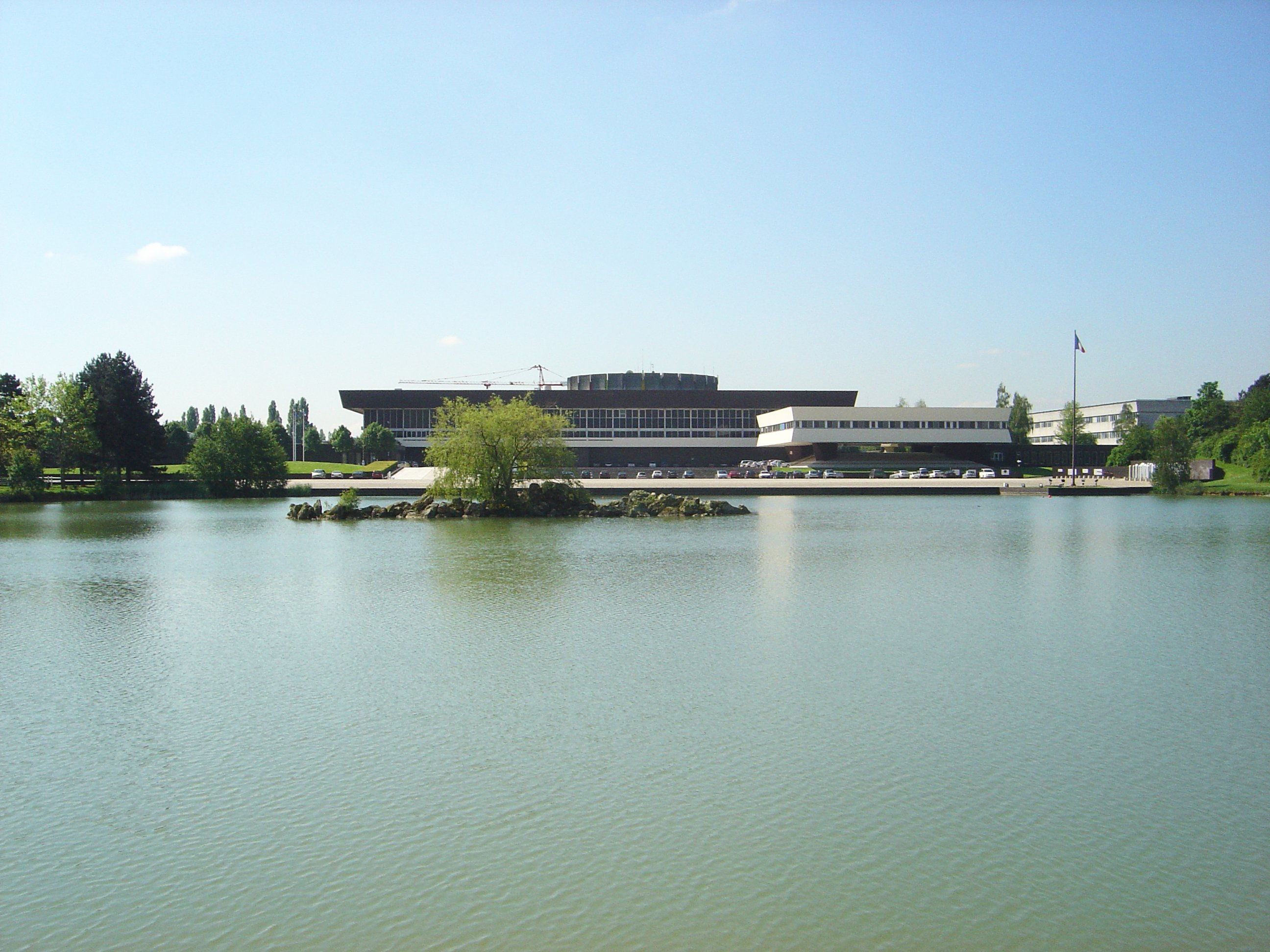
The École Polytechnique

Brocard attended the École Polytechnique from 1865 to 1867.

As was the norm at the time, he, after graduation, became a technical officer in the French military, which had been reorganized in 1866. He acted as a meteorologist in the French navy, and general technician as well.

Brocard soon saw active service, as Napoleon III declared war upon Prussia. Brocard was one of the 120,000 men under Marshal MacMahon led to Metz to free the French army of the Rhine. The French army, however, was defeated on 31 August at the Battle of Sedan, and was taken prisoner along with approximately 83,000 other combatants.

=== Middle years ===
After Brocard was freed, he returned to his military position and continued teaching, publishing his mathematical articles in the most popular mathematical journal of that time, Nouvelles Correspondances Mathématiques (also called Nouvelles annales mathématiques). He joined the Société Mathématique de France in 1873, just a year after its founding. In 1875, he was inducted into the French Association for the Advancement of Science as well as the French Meteorological Society. He was shortly after sent to northern Africa, where he served as a military technician for the French forces stationed in Algiers, the seat of French Africa. While in Algiers, Brocard founded the Meteorological Institute of Algiers. Brocard also visited Oran while in northern Africa, which was occupied by the French in 1831.

=== Discovery of Brocard points ===
During a meeting of the French Association for the Advancement of Science, Brocard presented a self-written article entitled Etudes d'un nouveau cercle du plan du triangle, his first paper on the Brocard points, the Brocard triangle, and the Brocard circle, all of which today bear his name.

=== Later years ===
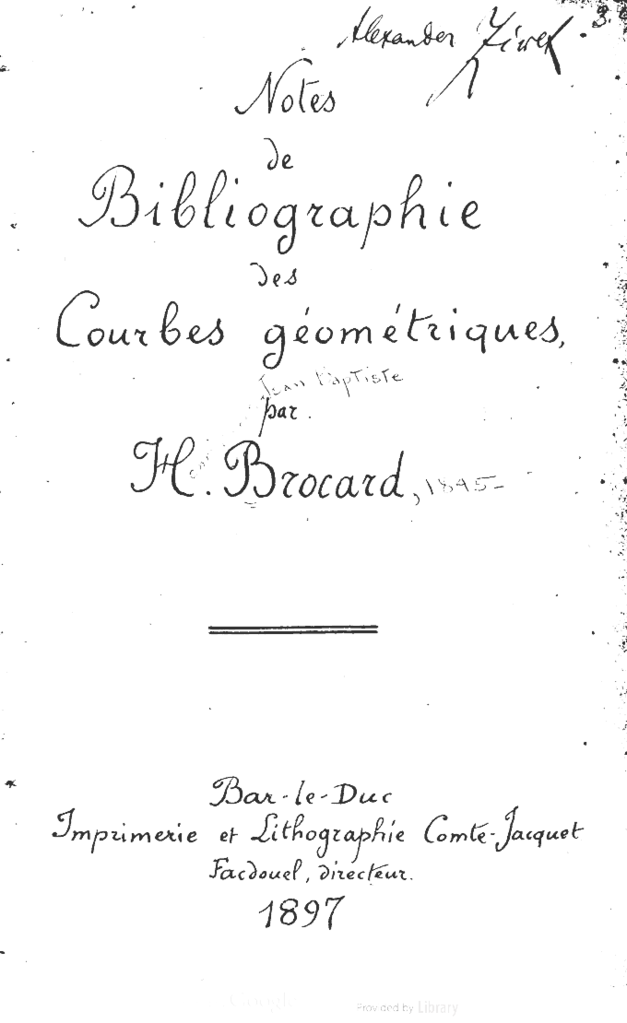
The first page of Henri Brocard's Notes de bibliographie des courbes géométriques

In 1884 Brocard returned to France. He served with the Meteorological Commission in Montpellier before moving to Grenoble and lastly Bar-le-duc. He honorably retired from the French military in 1910 as a lieutenant colonel. His remaining two major publications were Notes de bibliographie des courbes géométriques (1897, 1899, published in two volumes) and the Courbes géométriques remarquables (1920, posthumous 1967, also published in two volumes) which was written in collaboration with Timoléon Lemoyne.

Brocard attended the International Congress of Mathematicians at Zurich in 1897, Paris in 1900, Heidelberg in 1904, Rome in 1908, Cambridge, England in 1912, and Strasbourg in 1920.

Brocard spent the last years of his life in Bar-le-Duc. He was offered the presidency of Bar-le-Duc's Letters, Sciences, and Arts Society, of which he had been a longtime member and correspondent for several foreign academies of, but declined. He died on 16 January 1922 while on a trip to Kensington, London, England.

== Contributions ==
=== Brocard triangle, Brocard circle, and Brocard points ===
A diagram of the Brocard point

Brocard's most well-known contributions to mathematics are the Brocard points, the Brocard circle, and the Brocard triangle. The positive Brocard point (sometimes known as the first Brocard point) of a Euclidean plane triangle is the interior point of the triangle for which the three angles formed by two of the vertices and the point are equal. Their common value is the Brocard angle of the triangle. The Brocard circle of the triangle is a circle having a diameter of the line segment between the circumcenter and symmedian. It contains the Brocard points. The Brocard triangle of a triangle is a triangle formed by the intersection of line from a vertex to its corresponding Brocard point and a line from another vertex to its corresponding Brocard point and the other two points constructed using different combinations of vertices and Brocard points. The Brocard triangle is inscribed in the Brocard circle.

=== Other mathematical contributions ===
Brocard published various other papers on mathematics during his time at Bar-le-duc, none of which became as well known as Etudes d'un nouveau cercle du plan du triangle. He also conjured up a famous unsolved problem thought to have no answers other than the three he provided. This problem is called Brocard's Problem. One other achievement of his is guessing at the meaning of the cryptic title of one of Girard Desargues' papers, DALG. In his paper Analyse d'autographes et autres écrits de Girard Desargues, he surmised that it stood for Des Argues, Lyonnais, Géometre, which is the generally accepted title.

=== Meteorology ===
The University of Algiers administrates the Meteorological Society which Brocard founded.

Though Brocard made no major notable original discoveries in meteorology, he founded the Meteorological Institute in Algiers and served as a meteorological technician during his time in the French military. He also published several notable papers on meteorology.

== See also ==
- Brocard's conjecture
