= Plane geometry (disambiguation) =

In mathematics, plane geometry refers generally to geometry in a two-dimensional space called a plane.

- Euclidean plane geometry, is the most common meaning; it includes
  - Plane analytic geometry
  - Plane synthetic geometry
- Plane projective geometry, the geometry of projective planes
- Geometry of finite planes, such as the Fano plane
- Affine geometry of affine planes
- Geometry of non-Euclidean planes, including
  - hyperbolic planes,
  - elliptic planes
  - two-dimensional spherical geometry.

== See also ==
- Plane curve
- Inversive geometry
- Geometrography
