= Brocard points =

Special points within a triangle

The Brocard point of a triangle, constructed at the intersection point of three circles

In geometry, Brocard points are special points within a triangle. They are named after Henri Brocard (1845–1922), a French mathematician.

== Definition ==
In a triangle △ABC with sides a, b, c, where the vertices are labeled A, B, C in counterclockwise order, there is exactly one point P such that the line segments A̅P̅, B̅P̅, C̅P̅ form the same angle, ω, with the respective sides c, a, b, namely that

$$\angle PAB = \angle PBC = \angle PCA =\omega.\,$$

Point P is called the first Brocard point of the triangle △ABC, and the angle ω is called the Brocard angle of the triangle. This angle has the property that

$$\cot\omega = \cot\!\bigl(\angle CAB\bigr) + \cot\!\bigl(\angle ABC\bigr) + \cot\!\bigl(\angle BCA\bigr).$$

There is also a second Brocard point, Q, in triangle △ABC such that line segments A̅Q̅, B̅Q̅, C̅Q̅ form equal angles with sides b, c, a respectively. In other words, the equations
$$\angle QCB = \angle QBA = \angle QAC$$
apply. Remarkably, this second Brocard point has the same Brocard angle as the first Brocard point. In other words, angle
$$\angle PBC = \angle PCA = \angle PAB$$
is the same as
$$\angle QCB = \angle QBA = \angle QAC.$$

The two Brocard points are closely related to one another; in fact, the difference between the first and the second depends on the order in which the angles of triangle △ABC are taken. So for example, the first Brocard point of △ABC is the same as the second Brocard point of △ACB.

The two Brocard points of a triangle △ABC are isogonal conjugates of each other.

== Construction ==
The most elegant construction of the Brocard points goes as follows. In the following example the first Brocard point is presented, but the construction for the second Brocard point is very similar.

As in the diagram above, form a circle through points A and B, tangent to edge B̅C̅ of the triangle (the center of this circle is at the point where the perpendicular bisector of A̅B̅ meets the line through point B that is perpendicular to B̅C̅). Symmetrically, form a circle through points B and C, tangent to edge A̅C̅, and a circle through points A and C, tangent to edge A̅B̅. These three circles have a common point, the first Brocard point of △ABC. See also Tangent lines to circles.

The three circles just constructed are also designated as epicycles of △ABC. The second Brocard point is constructed in similar fashion.

== Trilinears and barycentrics of the first two Brocard points ==
Homogeneous trilinear coordinates for the first and second Brocard points are:
$$\begin{array}{rccccc}
P= & \frac{c}{b} &:& \frac{a}{c} &:& \frac{b}{a} \\
Q= & \frac{b}{c} &:& \frac{c}{a} &:& \frac{a}{b}
\end{array}$$
Thus their barycentric coordinates are:
$$\begin{array}{rccccc}
P = & c^2a^2 &:& a^2b^2 &:& b^2c^2 \\
Q = & a^2b^2 &:& b^2c^2 &:& c^2a^2
\end{array}$$

== The segment between the first two Brocard points ==
The Brocard points are an example of a bicentric pair of points, but they are not triangle centers because neither Brocard point is invariant under similarity transformations: reflecting a scalene triangle, a special case of a similarity, turns one Brocard point into the other. However, the unordered pair formed by both points is invariant under similarities. The midpoint of the two Brocard points, called the Brocard midpoint, has trilinear coordinates

$$\sin(A +\omega ) : \sin(B+\omega) : \sin(C+\omega)=a(b^2+c^2):b(c^2+a^2):c(a^2+b^2),$$
and is a triangle center; it is center X(39) in the Encyclopedia of Triangle Centers. The third Brocard point, given in trilinear coordinates as

$$\csc (A-\omega ) : \csc(B-\omega):\csc(C-\omega)=a^{-3}:b^{-3}:c^{-3},$$

is the Brocard midpoint of the anticomplementary triangle. It is center X(76) in the Encyclopedia of Triangle Centers. Further:

- The third Brocard point is the isotomic conjugate of the symmedian point.
- The third Brocard point is the perspector of the Brocard triangle and △ABC.
- The third Brocard point lies on the diameter of the circumcircle joining the Steiner point and the Tarry point.

The distance between the first two Brocard points P and Q is always less than or equal to half the radius R of the triangle's circumcircle:

$$\overline{PQ} = 2R\sin \omega \sqrt{1-4\sin ^2\omega} \le \frac{R}{2}.$$

The segment between the first two Brocard points is perpendicularly bisected at the Brocard midpoint by the line connecting the triangle's circumcenter and its symmedian point. Moreover, the circumcenter, the Lemoine point, and the first two Brocard points are concyclic—they all fall on the Brocard circle, of which the segment connecting the circumcenter and the Lemoine point is a diameter. The tangents to the Brocard circle at the first two Brocard points concur at the isogonal conjugate of the third Brocard point.

== Distance from circumcenter ==
The Brocard points P and Q are equidistant from the triangle's circumcenter O:

$$\overline{PO} = \overline{QO} = R\sqrt{\frac{a^4+b^4+c^4}{a^2b^2+b^2c^2+c^2a^2}-1} = R\sqrt{1-4\sin^2 \omega }.$$

== Similarities and congruences ==
The pedal triangles of the first and second Brocard points are congruent to each other and similar to the original triangle.

If the lines AP, BP, CP, each through one of a triangle's vertices and its first Brocard point, intersect the triangle's circumcircle at points L, M, N, then the triangle △LMN is congruent with the original triangle △ABC. The same is true if the first Brocard point P is replaced by the second Brocard point Q.
