= Lemoine's problem =

Geometric construction problem relating to triangles

In geometry, Lemoine's problem is a straightedge and compass construction problem posed by French mathematician Émile Lemoine in 1868:

Given one vertex of each of the equilateral triangles placed on the sides of a triangle, construct the original triangle.

The problem was published as Question 864 in Nouvelles Annales de Mathématiques (Series 2, Volume 7 (1868), p 191). The chief interest in the problem is that a discussion of the solution of the problem by Ludwig Kiepert published in Nouvelles Annales de Mathématiques (series 2, Volume 8 (1869), pp 40–42) contained a description of a hyperbola which is now known as the Kiepert hyperbola.

== Ludwig Kiepert's solution ==
Diagram illustrating Lemma 1 .

Diagram illustrating Ludwig Kiepert's solution to Lemoine's problem

Kiepert establishes the validity of his construction by proving a few lemmas.

Problem
Let A_{1}, B_{1}, C_{1} be the vertices of the equilateral triangles placed on the sides of a triangle $\triangle ABC.$ Given A_{1}, B_{1}, C_{1} construct A, B, C.

Lemma 1
If on the three sides of an arbitrary triangle $\triangle ABC,$ one describes equilateral triangles $\triangle ABC_1,$ $\triangle ACB_1,$ $\triangle BCA_1,$ then the line segments $\overline{AA_1},$ $\overline{BB_1},$ $\overline{CC_1}$ are equal, they concur in a point P, and the angles they form one another are equal to 60°.

Lemma 2
If on $\triangle A_1B_1C_1$ one makes the same construction as that on $\triangle ABC,$ there will have three equilateral triangles $\triangle A_1B_1C_2,$ $\triangle A_1C_1B_2,$ $\triangle B_1C_1A_2,$ three equal line segments $\overline{A_1A_2},$ $\overline{B_2B_2},$ $\overline{C_2C_2},$ which will also concur at the point P.

Lemma 3
A, B, C are respectively the midpoints of $\overline{A_1A_2},$ $\overline{B_2B_2},$ $\overline{C_2C_2}.$

Solution
- Describe on the segments $\overline{A_1B_1},$ $\overline{A_1C_1},$ $\overline{B_1C_1}$ the equilateral triangles $\triangle A_1B_1C_1,$ $\triangle A_1C_2B_2,$ $\triangle B_1C_1A_2,$ respectively.
- The midpoints of $\overline{A_1A_2},$ $\overline{B_2B_2},$ $\overline{C_2C_2}$ are, respectively, the vertices A, B, C of the required triangle.

== Other solutions ==
Several other people in addition to Kiepert submitted their solutions during 1868–9, including Messrs Williere (at Arlon), Brocard, Claverie (Lycee de Clermont), Joffre (Lycee Charlemagne), Racine (Lycee de Poitiers), Augier (Lycee de Caen), V. Niebylowski, and L. Henri Lorrez. Kiepert's solution was more complete than the others.
