= Lemoine's conjecture =

Number theory conjecture about odd integers

In number theory, Lemoine's conjecture, also sometimes known as Levy's conjecture, states that all odd integers greater than 5 can be represented as the sum of an odd prime number and an even semiprime.

The conjecture was first proposed by Émile Lemoine in 1895, but was erroneously attributed by MathWorld to Hyman Levy who pondered it in the 1960s.

== Formal definition ==
Algebraically, the conjecture states that $2n + 1 = p + 2q$ always has a solution in primes $p$ and $q$ (not necessarily distinct) for $n > 2$. The Lemoine conjecture implies Goldbach's weak conjecture.

In 2008, Zhi-Wei Sun similarly conjectured that all odd integers greater than 3 can be represented as the sum of a prime number and the product of two consecutive positive integers; that is, $2n + 1 = p + m(m+1)$ for all $n > 1$.

== Example ==
For example, the odd integer $47$ can be expressed as the sum of a prime and an even semiprime in four different ways:

$$47 = 13 + 2\cdot 17 = 37 + 2\cdot5 = 41 + 2\cdot3 = 43 + 2\cdot2$$

The number of ways this can be done is given by (sequence A046927 in the OEIS). Lemoine's conjecture is that this sequence contains no zeros after the first three.

== Evidence ==
According to MathWorld, the conjecture has been verified by Corbitt up to 10^{9}. A blog post in June of 2019 additionally claimed to have verified the conjecture up to 10^{10}.

A proof was claimed in 2017 by Agama and Gensel, but this was later found to be flawed.

== See also ==
- Lemoine's conjecture and extensions
