= Perpendicular bisector construction of a quadrilateral =

In geometry, the perpendicular bisector construction of a quadrilateral is a construction which produces a new quadrilateral from a given quadrilateral using the perpendicular bisectors to the sides of the former quadrilateral. This construction arises naturally in an attempt to find a replacement for the circumcenter of a quadrilateral in the case that is non-cyclic.

== Definition of the construction ==
Suppose that the vertices of the quadrilateral $Q$ are given by $Q_1,Q_2,Q_3,Q_4$. Let $b_1,b_2,b_3,b_4$ be the perpendicular bisectors of sides $Q_1Q_2,Q_2Q_3,Q_3Q_4,Q_4Q_1$ respectively. Then their intersections $Q_i^{(2)}=b_{i+2}b_{i+3}$, with subscripts considered modulo 4, form the consequent quadrilateral $Q^{(2)}$. The construction is then iterated on $Q^{(2)}$ to produce $Q^{(3)}$ and so on.

First iteration of the perpendicular bisector construction

An equivalent construction can be obtained by letting the vertices of $Q^{(i+1)}$ be the circumcenters of the 4 triangles formed by selecting combinations of 3 vertices of $Q^{(i)}$.

== Properties ==
1. If $Q^{(1)}$ is not cyclic, then $Q^{(2)}$ is not degenerate.

2. Quadrilateral $Q^{(2)}$ is never cyclic. Combining #1 and #2, $Q^{(3)}$ is always nondegenrate.

3. Quadrilaterals $Q^{(1)}$ and $Q^{(3)}$ are homothetic, and in particular, similar. Quadrilaterals $Q^{(2)}$ and $Q^{(4)}$ are also homothetic.

3. The perpendicular bisector construction can be reversed via isogonal conjugation. That is, given $Q^{(i+1)}$, it is possible to construct $Q^{(i)}$.

4. Let $\alpha, \beta, \gamma, \delta$ be the angles of $Q^{(1)}$. For every $i$, the ratio of areas of $Q^{(i)}$ and $Q^{(i+1)}$ is given by

$$(1/4)(\cot(\alpha)+\cot(\gamma))(\cot(\beta)+\cot(\delta)).$$

5. If $Q^{(1)}$ is convex then the sequence of quadrilaterals $Q^{(1)}, Q^{(2)},\ldots$ converges to the isoptic point of $Q^{(1)}$, which is also the isoptic point for every $Q^{(i)}$. Similarly, if $Q^{(1)}$ is concave, then the sequence $Q^{(1)}, Q^{(0)}, Q^{(-1)},\ldots$ obtained by reversing the construction converges to the Isoptic Point of the $Q^{(i)}$'s.

6. If $Q^{(1)}$ is tangential then $Q^{(2)}$ is also tangential.
