= Carnot's theorem (perpendiculars) =

Condition for 3 lines with common point to be perpendicular to the sides of triangle

Carnot's theorem: if three perpendiculars on triangle sides intersect in a common point F, then blue area = red area

Carnot's theorem, named after Lazare Carnot (English: /kɑːrˈnoʊ/ kar-NOH, French: [kaʁno]), describes a necessary and sufficient condition for three lines that are perpendicular to the (extended) sides of a triangle having a common point of intersection. The theorem can also be thought of as a generalization of the Pythagorean theorem.

== Theorem ==
For a triangle $\triangle ABC$ with sides $a, b, c$ consider three lines that are perpendicular to the triangle sides and intersect in a common point $F$. If $P_a, P_b, P_c$ are the pedal points of those three perpendiculars on the sides $a, b, c$, then the following equation holds:

$$|AP_c|^2+|BP_a|^2+|CP_b|^2=|BP_c|^2+|CP_a|^2+|AP_b|^2$$

The converse of the statement above is true as well, that is if the equation holds for the pedal points of three perpendiculars on the three triangle sides then they intersect in a common point. Therefore, the equation provides a necessary and sufficient condition.

== Special cases ==
If the triangle $\triangle ABC$ has a right angle in $C$, then we can construct three perpendiculars on the sides that intersect in $F=A$: the side $b$, the line perpendicular to $b$ and passing through $A$, and the line perpendicular to $c$ and passing through $A$. Then we have $P_a=C$, $P_b=A$ and $P_c=A$ and thus $|AP_b|=0$, $|AP_c|=0$, $|CP_a|=0$, $|CP_b|=b$, $|BP_a|=a$ and $|BP_c|=c$. The equation of Carnot's Theorem then yields the Pythagorean theorem $a^2 + b^2 =c^2$.

Another corollary is the property of perpendicular bisectors of a triangle to intersect in a common point. In the case of perpendicular bisectors you have $|AP_c| = |BP_c|$, $|BP_a| = |CP_a|$ and $|CP_b| = |AP_b|$ and therefore the equation above holds. which means all three perpendicular bisectors intersect in the same point.
