= Kosnita's theorem =

Geometric theorem regarding circles and triangles

Kosnita point of an arbitrary triangle. Triangle △ABC Circumcircle (centered at circumcenter O) Johnson circles (concur at O) AO_{a}, BO_{b}, CO_{c} (concur at Kosnita point)

In Euclidean geometry, Kosnita's theorem is a property of certain circles associated with an arbitrary triangle.

Let △ABC be an arbitrary triangle, O its circumcenter and O_{a}, O_{b}, O_{c} are the circumcenters of three triangles △OBC, △OCA, and △OAB respectively. The theorem asserts that the three straight lines AO_{a}, BO_{b}, and CO_{c} are concurrent. This result was established by the Romanian mathematician Cezar Coşniţă (1910–1962).

Their point of concurrence is known as the triangle's Kosnita point (named by Rigby in 1997). It is the isogonal conjugate of the nine-point center. It is triangle center X(54) in Clark Kimberling's list.
