= Geometrography =

Study of geometrical constructions

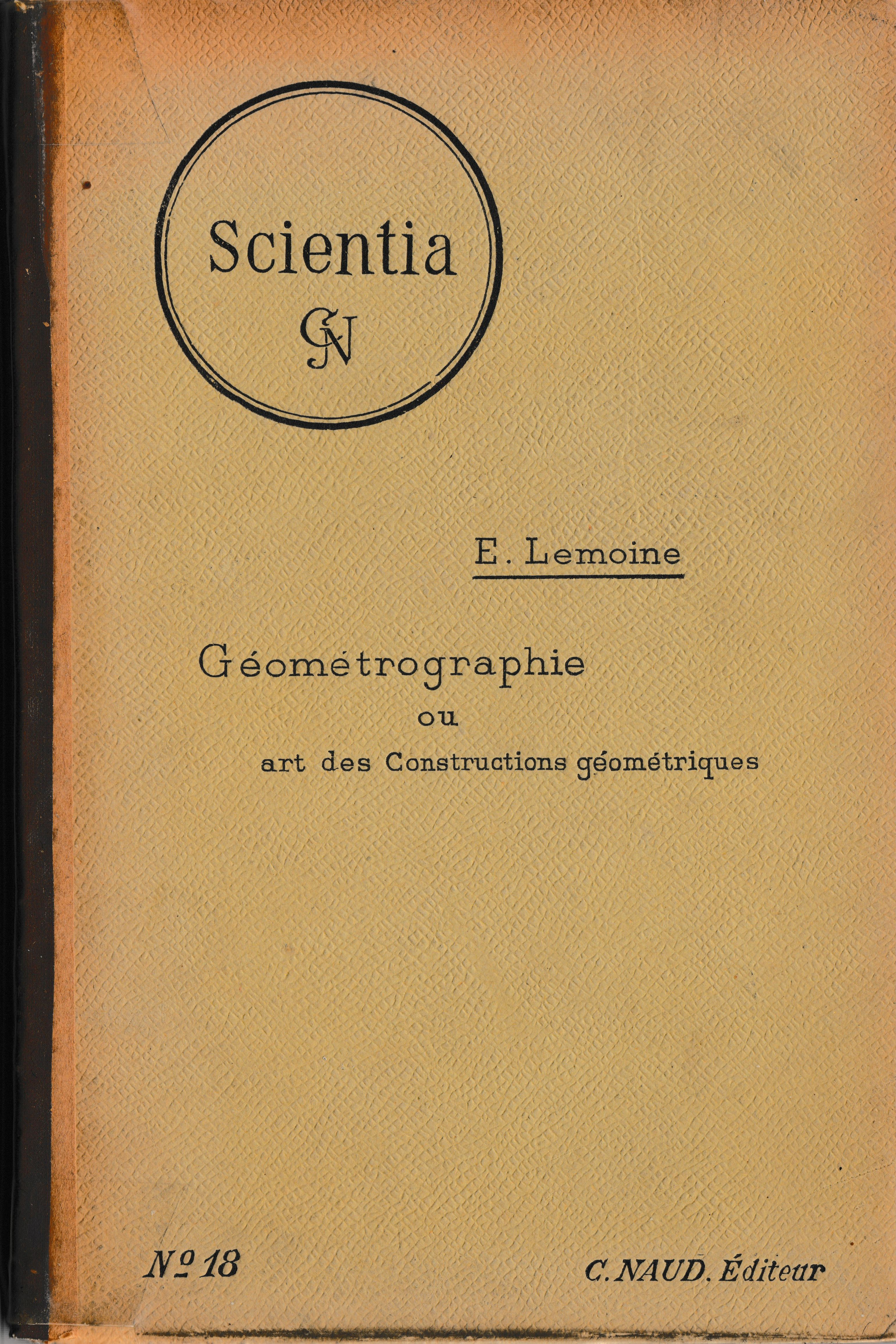
Cover of Lemoine's "Géométrographie"

In the mathematical field of geometry, geometrography is the study of geometrical constructions. The concepts and methods of geometrography were first expounded by Émile Lemoine (1840–1912), a French civil engineer and a mathematician, in a meeting of the French Association for the Advancement of the Sciences held at Oran in 1888. Lemoine later expanded his ideas in another memoir read at the Pau meeting of the same Association held in 1892.

It is well known in elementary geometry that certain geometrical constructions are simpler than certain others. But in many case it turns out that the apparent simplicity of a construction does not consist in the practical execution of the construction, but in the brevity of the statement of what has to be done. Can then any objective criterion be laid down by which an estimate may be formed of the relative simplicity of several different constructions for attaining the same end? Lemoine developed the ideas of geometrography to answer this question. The question of the ubiquity of a construction is also raised. Whether or not a construction, regardless of simplicity, can be applied in all or most conditions, or just in the special cases, is an important consideration.

== Basic ideas ==
In developing the ideas of geometrography, Lemoine restricted himself to Euclidean constructions using rulers and compasses alone. According to the analysis of Lemoine, all such constructions can be executed, as a sequence of operations selected form a fixed set of five elementary operations. The five elementary operations identified by Lemoine are the following:

Elementary operations in a geometrical construction

Sl. No.	Operation	Notation for operation
1	To place the edge of the ruler in coincidence with a point	R_{1}
2	To draw a straight line	R_{2}
3	To put a point of the compasses on a determinate point	C_{1}
4	To put a point of the compasses on an indeterminate point of a line	C_{2}
5	To describe a circle	C_{3}

In a geometrical construction the fact that an operation X is to be done n times is denoted by the expression nX. The operation of placing a ruler in coincidence with two points is indicated by 2R_{1}. The operation of putting one point of the compasses on a determinate point and the other point of the compasses on another determinate point is 2C_{1}.

Every geometrical construction can be represented by an expression of the following form

l_{1}R_{1} + l_{2}R_{2} + m_{1}C_{1} + m_{2}C_{2} + m_{3}C_{3}.

Here the coefficients l_{1}, etc. denote the number of times any particular operation is performed.

=== Coefficient of simplicity ===
The number l_{1} + l_{2} + m_{1} +m_{2} + m_{3} is called the coefficient of simplicity, or the simplicity of the construction. It denotes the total number of operations.

=== Coefficient of exactitude ===
The number l_{1} + m_{1} + m_{2} is called the coefficient of exactitude, or the exactitude of the construction; it denotes the number of preparatory operations, on which the exactitude of the construction depends.

== Examples ==
Lemoine applied his scheme to analyze more than sixty problems in elementary geometry.

- The construction of a triangle given the three vertices can be represented by the expression 4R_{1} + 3R_{2}.
- A certain construction of the regular heptadecagon involving the Carlyle circles can be represented by the expression 8R_{1} + 4R_{2} + 22C_{1} + 11C_{3} and has simplicity 45.

== See also ==
- Hilbert's twenty-fourth problem on the simplicity of proofs.
