= Lemoine point =

Intersection of the three symmedian lines of a triangle

A triangle with medians (black), angle bisectors (dotted) and symmedians (red). The symmedians intersect in the symmedian point L, the angle bisectors in the incenter I and the medians in the centroid G.

In geometry, the Lemoine point, Grebe point or symmedian point is the intersection of the three symmedians (medians reflected at the associated angle bisectors) of a triangle. In other words, it is the isogonal conjugate of the centroid of a triangle.

Ross Honsberger called its existence "one of the crown jewels of modern geometry".

In the Encyclopedia of Triangle Centers the symmedian point appears as the sixth point, X(6). For a non-equilateral triangle, it lies in the open orthocentroidal disk punctured at its own center, and could be any point therein.

== Construction ==
The symmedian point of a triangle with side lengths a, b and c has homogeneous trilinear coordinates [a : b : c].

An algebraic way to find the symmedian point is to express the triangle by three linear equations in two unknowns given by the hesse normal forms of the corresponding lines. The solution of this overdetermined system found by the least squares method gives the coordinates of the point. It also solves the optimization problem to find the point with a minimal sum of squared distances from the sides.

The symmedian point of a triangle ABC can be constructed in the following way: let the tangent lines of the circumcircle of ABC through B and C meet at A', and analogously define B' and C'; then A'B'C' is the tangential triangle of ABC, and the lines AA', BB' and CC' intersect at the symmedian point of ABC. (Note: If ABC is a right triangle with right angle at A, this statement needs to be modified by dropping the reference to AA' since the point A' does not exist.) It can be shown that these three lines meet at a point using Brianchon's theorem. Line AA' is a symmedian, as can be seen by drawing the circle with center A' through B and C.

== Relation to other triangle centers ==
The Gergonne point of a triangle is the same as the symmedian point of the contact triangle. The mittenpunkt of a triangle is the same as the symmedian point of the excentral triangle.

The centroid of the pedal triangle of the symmedian point is the symmedian point. The centroid of the antipedal triangle of the symmedian point is the circumcenter.

== Tetrahedra ==
For the extension to an irregular tetrahedron see symmedian.

== History ==
The French mathematician Émile Lemoine proved the existence of the symmedian point in 1873, and Ernst Wilhelm Grebe published a paper on it in 1847. Simon Antoine Jean L'Huilier had also noted the point in 1809.
