= Gaston Tarry =

French mathematician (1843–1913)

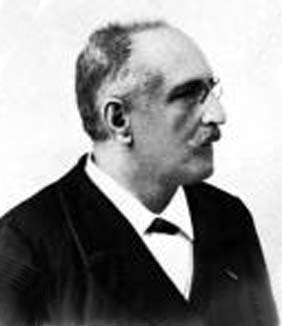
Gaston Tarry

Gaston Tarry (27 September 1843 – 21 June 1913) was a French mathematician. Born in Villefranche de Rouergue, Aveyron, he studied mathematics at high school before joining the civil service in Algeria. He pursued mathematics as an amateur.

== Contributions ==
In 1895 Tarry published a systematic algorithm for traversing a maze without prior knowledge of its layout; this method is now recognized in graph theory as one of the earliest variants of a depth-first search (DFS) algorithm.

Tarry also made contributions to number theory and combinatorics, including work on the Prouhet–Tarry–Escott problem.

In 1900 Tarry confirmed Leonhard Euler's conjecture that no 6×6 Graeco-Latin square was possible (the 36 officers problem).

== Publications ==
- Tarry, Gaston (1886). "Géométrie de situation: Nombre de manières distinctes de parcourir en une seule course toutes les allées d'un labyrinthe rentrant...". Comptes Rendus de l'Association Française pour l'Avancement des Sciences. 15 (2): 49–53.
- Tarry, Gaston (1895). "Le problème des labyrinthes". Nouvelles Annales de Mathématiques. Série 3. 14: 187–190.
- Tarry, Gaston (1898). "Question 1401". L'Intermédiaire des Mathématiciens. 5: 266–267.
- Tarry, Gaston (1900). "Le problème des 36 officiers". Comptes Rendus de l'Association Française pour l'Avancement des Sciences. 29 (1): 122–123.
- Tarry, Gaston (1901). "Le problème des 36 officiers". Comptes Rendus de l'Association Française pour l'Avancement des Sciences. 29 (2): 170–203.

== See also ==
- List of amateur mathematicians
- Prouhet–Tarry–Escott problem
- Tarry point
- Tetramagic square
