= Brocard circle =

Circle constructed from a triangle

In geometry, the Brocard circle (or seven-point circle) is a circle derived from a given triangle. It passes through the circumcenter and symmedian point of the triangle, and is centered at the midpoint of the line segment joining them (so that this segment is a diameter).

== Equation ==
In terms of the side lengths $a$, $b$, and $c$ of the given triangle, and the areal coordinates $(x,y,z)$ for points inside the triangle (where the $x$-coordinate of a point is the area of the triangle made by that point with the side of length $a$, etc), the Brocard circle consists of the points satisfying the equation

$$b^2 c^2 x^2 + a^2 c^2 y^2 + a^2 b^2 z^2 - a^4 y z - b^4 x z - c^4 x y=0.$$

== Related points ==
The two Brocard points lie on this circle, as do the vertices of the Brocard triangle. These five points, together with the other two points on the circle (the circumcenter and symmedian), justify the name "seven-point circle".

The Brocard circle is concentric with the first Lemoine circle.

== Special cases ==
If the triangle is equilateral, the circumcenter and symmedian coincide and therefore the Brocard circle reduces to a single point.

== History ==
The Brocard circle is named for Henri Brocard, who presented a paper on it to the French Association for the Advancement of Science in Algiers in 1881.

== See also ==
- Nine-point circle
