= Black triangle =

Black triangle may refer to:

== Places ==
- Black Triangle (region), across Germany, Poland and the Czech Republic, long characterized by extremely high levels of pollution
- Black triangle, the nickname given to the area south of Montreal affected by a long term blackout during the January 1998 North American ice storm

== Other uses ==
- Black triangle (badge), a Nazi concentration camp badge worn by inmates deemed "asocial"
- Black triangle, an LGBT symbol reclaimed from the Nazi use
- Angularis nigra (Latin for 'black angle'), triangular gap between teeth
- Black triangle (pharmacovigilance), suffixed to the trade name of British medicines when the drug is new on the market
- Black triangle (UFO), a type of UFO
- Black triangle, several code points in Unicode Geometric Shapes
