= Jacobi's theorem (geometry) =

Geometric theorem relating a given triangle and three angles to a point

Adjacent colored angles are equal in measure. The point N is the Jacobi point for triangle △ABC and these angles.

In plane geometry, a Jacobi point is a point in the Euclidean plane determined by a triangle △ABC and a triple of angles α, β, γ. This information is sufficient to determine three points X, Y, Z such that
$$\begin{align}
\angle ZAB &= \angle YAC &= \alpha, \\
\angle XBC &= \angle ZBA &= \beta, \\
\angle YCA &= \angle XCB &= \gamma.
\end{align}$$
Then, by a theorem of Karl Friedrich Andreas Jacobi, the lines AX, BY, CZ are concurrent, at a point N called the Jacobi point.

The Jacobi point is a generalization of the Fermat point, which is obtained by letting α = β = γ = 60° and △ABC having no angle being greater or equal to 120°.

If the three angles above are equal, then N lies on the rectangular hyperbola given in areal coordinates by

$yz(\cot B - \cot C) + zx(\cot C - \cot A) + xy(\cot A - \cot B) = 0,$

which is Kiepert's hyperbola. Each choice of three equal angles determines a triangle center.

The Jacobi point can be further generalized as follows: If points K, L, M, N, O and P are constructed on the sides of triangle ABC so that BK/KC = CL/LB = CM/MA = AN/NC = AO/OB = BP/PA, triangles OPD, KLE and MNF are constructed so that ∠DOP = ∠FNM, ∠DPO = ∠EKL, ∠ELK = ∠FMN and triangles LMY, NOZ and PKX are respectively similar to triangles OPD, KLE and MNF, then DY, EZ and FX are concurrent.
