= Isogonal conjugate =

Geometric transformation applied to points with respect to a given triangle

Construction of an isogonal conjugate P* for an arbitrary triangle △ABC. Angle bisectors (concur at incenter I) Lines from each vertex to P Lines to P reflected about angle bisectors (concur at P*)

Isogonal conjugate transformation over the points inside the triangle.

In geometry, the isogonal conjugate of a point P with respect to a triangle △ABC is constructed by reflecting the lines PA, PB, PC about the angle bisectors of A, B, C respectively. These three reflected lines concur at the isogonal conjugate of P. (This definition applies only to points not on a sideline of triangle △ABC.) This is a direct result of the trigonometric form of Ceva's theorem.

The isogonal conjugate of a point P is sometimes denoted by P*. The isogonal conjugate of P* is P.

The isogonal conjugate of the incentre I is itself. The isogonal conjugate of the orthocentre H is the circumcentre O. The isogonal conjugate of the centroid G is (by definition) the symmedian point K. The isogonal conjugates of the Fermat points are the isodynamic points and vice versa. The Brocard points are isogonal conjugates of each other.

In trilinear coordinates, if X = x : y : z is a point not on a sideline of triangle △ABC, then its isogonal conjugate is

$$X^* = X^{-1} = \frac{1}{x} : \frac{1}{y} : \frac{1}{z}.$$

Because the conjugate coordinates are reciprocals, the isogonal conjugate of X is sometimes denoted by X^{–1}. The set S of triangle centers under the trilinear product, defined by

$$(p:q:r)*(u:v:w) = pu:qv:rw,$$

is a commutative group, and the inverse of each X in S is X^{–1}.

As isogonal conjugation is a function, it makes sense to speak of the isogonal conjugate of sets of points, such as lines and circles. For example, the isogonal conjugate of a line is a circumconic; specifically, an ellipse, parabola, or hyperbola according as the line intersects the circumcircle in 0, 1, or 2 points. The isogonal conjugate of the circumcircle is the line at infinity. Several well-known cubics (e.g., Thompson cubic, Darboux cubic, Neuberg cubic) are self-isogonal-conjugate, in the sense that if X is on the cubic, then X^{–1} is also on the cubic.

== Another construction for the isogonal conjugate of a point ==
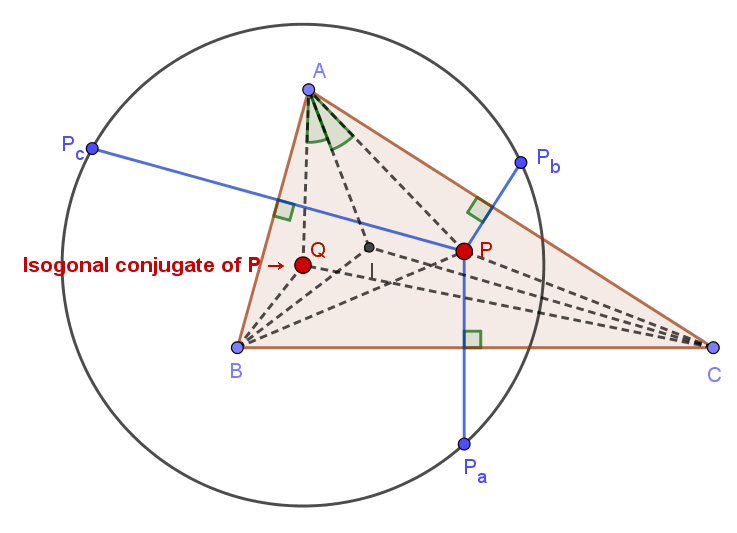
A second definition of isogonal conjugate

For a given point P in the plane of triangle △ABC, let the reflections of P in the sidelines BC, CA, AB be P_{a}, P_{b}, P_{c}. Then the center of the circle 〇P_{a}P_{b}P_{c} is the isogonal conjugate of P.

== See also ==
- Isotomic conjugate
- Central line (geometry)
- Triangle center
