= Concurrent lines =

Lines which intersect at a single point

Lines A, B and C are concurrent in Y.

In geometry, lines in a plane or higher-dimensional space are concurrent if they intersect at a single point.

The set of all lines through a point is called a pencil, and their common intersection is called the vertex of the pencil.

In any affine space (including a Euclidean space) the set of lines parallel to a given line (sharing the same direction) is also called a pencil, and the vertex of each pencil of parallel lines is a distinct point at infinity; including these points results in a projective space in which every pair of lines has an intersection.

== Examples ==
=== Triangles ===
In a triangle, four basic types of sets of concurrent lines are altitudes, angle bisectors, medians, and perpendicular bisectors:

- A triangle's altitudes run from each vertex and meet the opposite side at a right angle. The point where the three altitudes meet is the orthocenter.
- Angle bisectors are rays running from each vertex of the triangle and bisecting the associated angle. They all meet at the incenter.
- Medians connect each vertex of a triangle to the midpoint of the opposite side. The three medians meet at the centroid.
- Perpendicular bisectors are lines running out of the midpoints of each side of a triangle at 90 degree angles. The three perpendicular bisectors meet at the circumcenter.

Other sets of lines associated with a triangle are concurrent as well. For example:

- Any median (which is necessarily a bisector of the triangle's area) is concurrent with two other area bisectors each of which is parallel to a side.
- A cleaver of a triangle is a line segment that bisects the perimeter of the triangle and has one endpoint at the midpoint of one of the three sides. The three cleavers concur at the center of the Spieker circle, which is the incircle of the medial triangle.
- A splitter of a triangle is a line segment having one endpoint at one of the three vertices of the triangle and bisecting the perimeter. The three splitters concur at the Nagel point of the triangle.
- Any line through a triangle that splits both the triangle's area and its perimeter in half goes through the triangle's incenter, and each triangle has one, two, or three of these lines. Thus if there are three of them, they concur at the incenter.
- The Tarry point of a triangle is the point of concurrency of the lines through the vertices of the triangle perpendicular to the corresponding sides of the triangle's first Brocard triangle.
- The Schiffler point of a triangle is the point of concurrence of the Euler lines of four triangles: the triangle in question, and the three triangles that each share two vertices with it and have its incenter as the other vertex.
- The Napoleon points and generalizations of them are points of concurrency. For example, the first Napoleon point is the point of concurrency of the three lines each from a vertex to the centroid of the equilateral triangle drawn on the exterior of the opposite side from the vertex. A generalization of this notion is the Jacobi point.
- The de Longchamps point is the point of concurrence of several lines with the Euler line.
- Three lines, each formed by drawing an external equilateral triangle on one of the sides of a given triangle and connecting the new vertex to the original triangle's opposite vertex, are concurrent at a point called the first isogonal center. In the case in which the original triangle has no angle greater than 120°, this point is also the Fermat point.
- The Apollonius point is the point of concurrence of three lines, each of which connects a point of tangency of the circle to which the triangle's excircles are internally tangent, to the opposite vertex of the triangle.

=== Quadrilaterals ===
- The two bimedians of a quadrilateral (segments joining midpoints of opposite sides) and the line segment joining the midpoints of the diagonals are concurrent and are all bisected by their point of intersection.
- In a tangential quadrilateral, the four angle bisectors concur at the center of the incircle.
- Other concurrencies of a tangential quadrilateral are given here.
- In a cyclic quadrilateral, four line segments, each perpendicular to one side and passing through the opposite side's midpoint, are concurrent. These line segments are called the maltitudes, which is an abbreviation for midpoint altitude. Their common point is called the anticenter.
- A convex quadrilateral is ex-tangential if and only if there are six concurrent angles bisectors: the internal angle bisectors at two opposite vertex angles, the external angle bisectors at the other two vertex angles, and the external angle bisectors at the angles formed where the extensions of opposite sides intersect.

=== Hexagons ===
- If the successive sides of a cyclic hexagon are a, b, c, d, e, f, then the three main diagonals concur at a single point if and only if ace = bdf.
- If a hexagon has an inscribed conic, then by Brianchon's theorem its principal diagonals are concurrent (as in the above image).
- Concurrent lines arise in the dual of Pappus's hexagon theorem.
- For each side of a cyclic hexagon, extend the adjacent sides to their intersection, forming a triangle exterior to the given side. Then the segments connecting the circumcenters of opposite triangles are concurrent.

=== Regular polygons ===
- If a regular polygon has an even number of sides, the diagonals connecting opposite vertices are concurrent at the center of the polygon.

=== Circles ===
- The perpendicular bisectors of all chords of a circle are concurrent at the center of the circle.
- The lines perpendicular to the tangents to a circle at the points of tangency are concurrent at the center.
- All area bisectors and perimeter bisectors of a circle are diameters, and they are concurrent at the circle's center.

=== Ellipses ===
- All area bisectors and perimeter bisectors of an ellipse are concurrent at the center of the ellipse.

=== Hyperbolas ===
- In a hyperbola the following are concurrent: (1) a circle passing through the hyperbola's foci and centered at the hyperbola's center; (2) either of the lines that are tangent to the hyperbola at the vertices; and (3) either of the asymptotes of the hyperbola.
- The following are also concurrent: (1) the circle that is centered at the hyperbola's center and that passes through the hyperbola's vertices; (2) either directrix; and (3) either of the asymptotes.

=== Tetrahedrons ===
- In a tetrahedron, the four medians and three bimedians are all concurrent at a point called the centroid of the tetrahedron.
- An isodynamic tetrahedron is one in which the cevians that join the vertices to the incenters of the opposite faces are concurrent, and an isogonic tetrahedron has concurrent cevians that join the vertices to the points of contact of the opposite faces with the inscribed sphere of the tetrahedron.
- In an orthocentric tetrahedron the four altitudes are concurrent.

== Algebra ==
According to the Rouché–Capelli theorem, a system of equations is consistent if and only if the rank of the coefficient matrix is equal to the rank of the augmented matrix (the coefficient matrix augmented with a column of intercept terms), and the system has a unique solution if and only if that common rank equals the number of variables. Thus with two variables the k lines in the plane, associated with a set of k equations, are concurrent if and only if the rank of the k × 2 coefficient matrix and the rank of the k × 3 augmented matrix are both 2. In that case only two of the k equations are independent, and the point of concurrency can be found by solving any two mutually independent equations simultaneously for the two variables.

== Projective geometry ==
In projective geometry, in two dimensions concurrency is the dual of collinearity; in three dimensions, concurrency is the dual of coplanarity.
