= Tarry point =

Point associated with any triangle

In geometry, the Tarry point T for a triangle △ABC is a point of concurrency of the lines through the vertices of the triangle perpendicular to the corresponding sides of the triangle's first Brocard triangle △DEF. The Tarry point lies on the other endpoint of the diameter of the circumcircle drawn through the Steiner point. The point is named for Gaston Tarry.

== See also ==
- Concurrent lines
