= Brocard triangle =

Triangle constructed from another triangle

The Brocard triangle (in black) of the triangle ABC. B1 and B2 are the two Brocard points.

In geometry, the Brocard triangle of a triangle is a triangle formed by the intersection of lines from a vertex to its corresponding Brocard point and a line from another vertex to its corresponding Brocard point and the other two points constructed using different combinations of vertices and Brocard points. This triangle is also called the first Brocard triangle, as further triangles can be formed by forming the Brocard triangle of the Brocard triangle and continuing this pattern. The Brocard triangle is inscribed in the Brocard circle. It is named for Henri Brocard.

The vertices of the Brocard triangle also lie on parallels to the triangle sides through the symmedian point, and on perpendiculars to the triangle sides through the circumcenter, allowing alternative constructions. See Steiner point (triangle).

== See also ==
- Henri Brocard
- Brocard points
