= Nathan Altshiller Court =

Polish-American mathematician

Nathan Altshiller Court

Nathan Altshiller Court (January 22, 1881 – July 20, 1968) was a Polish–American mathematician. He was a geometer and the author of the popular book College Geometry, who spent most of his career at the University of Oklahoma.

== Biography ==
Nathan A. Court was born Natan Altszyller on 22 January 1881, in Warsaw, Russian Poland, the eldest of nine children. He attended primary and secondary school in Warsaw, but due to anti-Jewish discrimination could not attend university there. In 1907 he moved to Belgium where he attended the University of Liège and the University of Ghent, receiving his D.Sc. in 1911.

Immediately afterward he moved to New York City, anglicizing his name to Nathan Altshiller. Though he could not read or write in English when he arrived, within weeks he began lecturing in advanced mathematics at Columbia University, and at the beginning of the next semester he was hired as a mathematics instructor teaching evening classes while doing his graduate work in Mathematics and Astronomy during the day. In 1912 he married Sophie Ravitch, whom he had known in Warsaw. He left New York in 1913, teaching for two years at the University of Washington in Seattle where his son Arnold was born in 1914, and for two years at the University of Colorado.

In 1916 he moved to the University of Oklahoma, where he remained for the rest of his career. In 1919, he became a U.S. citizen and changed his last name to Court, keeping Altshiller as a middle name. The first edition of his best known book, College Geometry, a university-level textbook in synthetic geometry, was published in 1925. In 1935 he published the solid geometry textbook Modern Pure Solid Geometry and became a full professor at the University of Oklahoma. He continued teaching there until his retirement in 1951. College Geometry was continually in print without revision for over 25 years, but a revised edition was published in 1952. A collection of his essays, Mathematics in Fun and in Earnest, was published in 1958.

Court died of heart attack in Norman, Oklahoma on 20 July 1968.

In his recognition, the Nathan A. Court Award was established by the OU Department of Mathematics, given to an outstanding freshman or sophomore math major.

== Works ==
- College Geometry: An Introduction to the Modern Geometry of the Triangle and the Circle, 2nd ed., Barnes & Noble, 1952 [1st ed. 1925]
- Modern Pure Solid Geometry, Macmillan, 1935
- Mathematics in Fun and in Earnest, Dial Press, 1958

Court wrote over 100 scholarly papers. He was a frequent contributor to The American Mathematical Monthly's problem section.
