= Median (geometry) =

Line segment joining a triangle's vertex to the midpoint of the opposite side

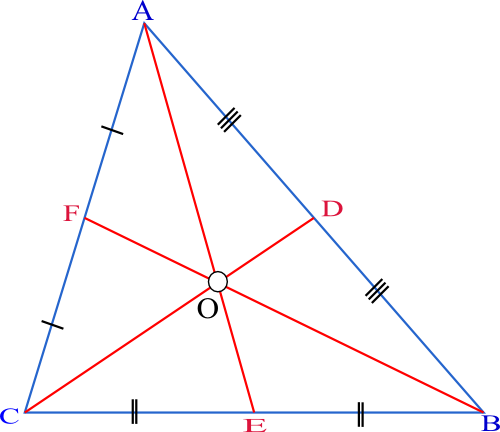
The triangle medians and the centroid O

In geometry, a median of a triangle is a line segment joining a vertex to the midpoint of the opposite side, thus bisecting that side. Every triangle has exactly three medians, one from each vertex, and they all intersect at the triangle's centroid. In the case of isosceles and equilateral triangles, a median bisects any angle at a vertex whose two adjacent sides are equal in length. The concept of a median extends to tetrahedra.

== Relation to center of mass ==
Each median of a triangle passes through the triangle's centroid, which is the center of mass of an infinitely thin object of uniform density coinciding with the triangle. Thus, the object would balance at the intersection point of the medians. The centroid is twice as close along any median to the side that the median intersects as it is to the vertex it emanates from.

== Equal-area division ==
Each median divides the area of the triangle in half, hence the name. (This equal area division does not by itself guarantee that the medians converge at the centroid. Any other lines that divide a triangle's area into two equal parts do not pass through the centroid, and in general the triangle would not balance on a line simply because it divides the triangle into two parts of equal area.) The three medians divide the triangle into six smaller triangles of equal area.

=== Proof of equal-area property ===
Consider a triangle ABC. Let D be the midpoint of $\overline{AB}$, E be the midpoint of $\overline{BC}$, F be the midpoint of $\overline{AC}$, and O be the centroid (most commonly denoted G).

By definition, $AD=DB, AF=FC, BE=EC$. Thus $[ADO]=[BDO], [AFO]=[CFO], [BEO]=[CEO],$ and $[ABE]=[ACE]$, where $[ABC]$ represents the area of triangle $\triangle ABC$ ; these hold because in each case the two triangles have bases of equal length and share a common altitude from the (extended) base, and a triangle's area equals one-half its base times its height.

We have:

$$[ABO]=[ABE]-[BEO]$$

$$[ACO]=[ACE]-[CEO]$$

Thus, $[ABO]=[ACO]$ and $[ADO]=[DBO], [ADO]=\frac{1}{2}[ABO]$

Since $[AFO]=[FCO], [AFO]= \frac{1}{2}[ACO]=\frac{1}{2}[ABO]=[ADO]$, therefore, $[AFO]=[FCO]=[DBO]=[ADO]$. Using the same method, one can show that $[AFO]=[FCO]=[DBO]=[ADO]=[BEO]=[CEO]$.

=== Three congruent triangles ===
In 2014 Lee Sallows discovered the following theorem:

The medians of any triangle dissect it into six equal area smaller triangles as in the figure above where three adjacent pairs of triangles meet at the midpoints D, E and F. If the two triangles in each such pair are rotated about their common midpoint until they meet so as to share a common side, then the three new triangles formed by the union of each pair are congruent.

== Formulas involving the medians' lengths ==
The lengths of the medians can be obtained from Apollonius' theorem as:
$$m_a = \frac{1}{2}\sqrt{2 b^2 + 2 c^2 - a^2}$$
$$m_b = \frac{1}{2}\sqrt{2 a^2 + 2 c^2 - b^2}$$
$$m_c = \frac{1}{2}\sqrt{2 a^2 + 2 b^2 - c^2}$$
where $a, b,$ and $c$ are the sides of the triangle with respective medians $m_a, m_b,$ and $m_c$ from their midpoints.

These formulas imply the relationships:
$$a = \frac{2}{3} \sqrt{-m_a^2 + 2m_b^2 + 2m_c^2} = \sqrt{2(b^2+c^2)-4m_a^2} = \sqrt{\frac{b^2}{2} - c^2 + 2m_b^2} = \sqrt{\frac{c^2}{2} - b^2 + 2m_c^2}$$
$$b = \frac{2}{3} \sqrt{-m_b^2 + 2m_a^2 + 2m_c^2} = \sqrt{2(a^2+c^2)-4m_b^2} = \sqrt{\frac{a^2}{2} - c^2 + 2m_a^2} = \sqrt{\frac{c^2}{2} - a^2 + 2m_c^2}$$
$$c = \frac{2}{3} \sqrt{-m_c^2 + 2m_b^2 + 2m_a^2} = \sqrt{2(b^2+a^2)-4m_c^2} = \sqrt{\frac{b^2}{2} - a^2 + 2m_b^2} = \sqrt{\frac{a^2}{2} - b^2 + 2m_a^2}.$$

== Other properties ==
Let ABC be a triangle, let G be its centroid, and let D, E, and F be the midpoints of BC, CA, and AB, respectively. For any point P in the plane of ABC then
$$PA+PB+PC \leq 2(PD+PE+PF) + 3PG.$$

The centroid divides each median into parts in the ratio 2:1, with the centroid being twice as close to the midpoint of a side as it is to the opposite vertex.

For any triangle with sides $a, b, c$ and medians $m_a, m_b, m_c,$
$$\tfrac{3}{4}(a+b+c) < m_a + m_b + m_c < a+b+c \quad \text{ and } \quad \tfrac{3}{4}\left(a^2+b^2+c^2\right) = m_a^2 + m_b^2 + m_c^2.$$

The medians from sides of lengths $a$ and $b$ are perpendicular if and only if $a^2 + b^2 = 5c^2.$

The medians of a right triangle with hypotenuse $c$ satisfy $m_a^2 + m_b^2 = 5m_c^2.$

Any triangle's area T can be expressed in terms of its medians $m_a, m_b$, and $m_c$ as follows. If their semi-sum $\left(m_a + m_b + m_c\right)/2$ is denoted by $\sigma$ then
$$T = \frac{4}{3} \sqrt{\sigma \left(\sigma - m_a\right)\left(\sigma - m_b\right)\left(\sigma - m_c\right)}.$$

== Tetrahedron ==
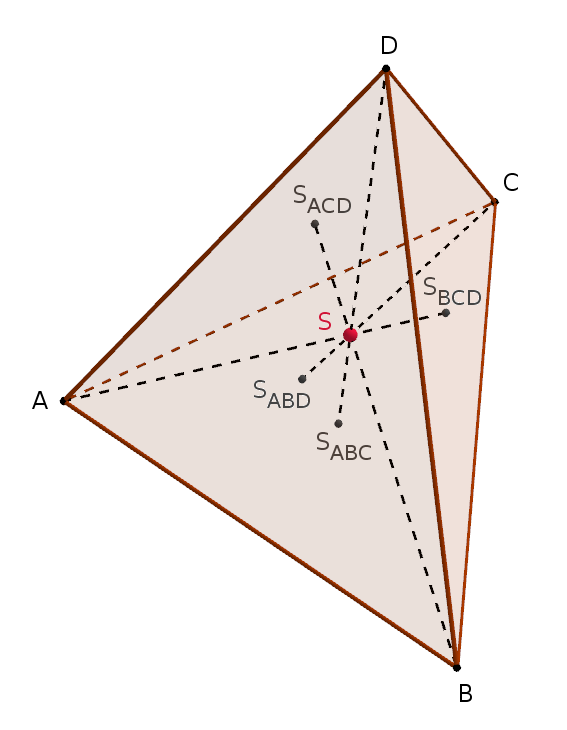
medians of a tetrahedron $$\begin{align}&\frac{|AS|}{|SS_{BCD}|}=\frac{|BS|}{|SS_{ACD}|}=\frac{|CS|}{|SS_{ABD}|}\\[4pt]={}&\frac{|DS|}{|SS_{ABC}|}=\frac{3}{1} \end{align}$$

A tetrahedron is a three-dimensional object having four triangular faces. A line segment joining a vertex of a tetrahedron with the centroid of the opposite face is called a median of the tetrahedron. There are four medians, and they are all concurrent at the centroid of the tetrahedron. As in the two-dimensional case, the centroid of the tetrahedron is the center of mass. However contrary to the two-dimensional case the centroid divides the medians not in a 2:1 ratio but in a 3:1 ratio (Commandino's theorem).

== See also ==
- Angle bisector
- Altitude (triangle)
- Automedian triangle
