= Mass point geometry =

Problem-solving technique in geometry

Mass point geometry, colloquially known as mass points, is a problem-solving technique in geometry which applies the physical principle of the center of mass to geometry problems involving triangles and intersecting cevians. All problems that can be solved using mass point geometry can also be solved using either similar triangles, vectors, or area ratios, but many students prefer to use mass points. Though modern mass point geometry was developed in the 1960s by New York high school students, the concept has been found to have been used as early as 1827 by August Ferdinand Möbius in his theory of homogeneous coordinates.

== Definitions ==
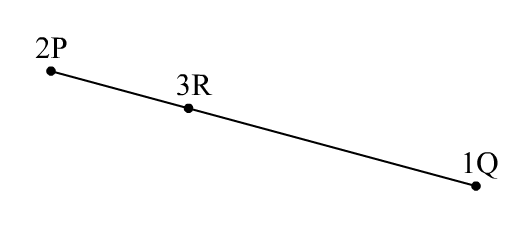
Example of mass point addition

The theory of mass points is defined according to the following definitions:

- Mass Point - A mass point is a pair $(m, P)$, also written as $mP$, including a mass, $m$, and an ordinary point, $P$ on a plane.
- Coincidence - We say that two points $mP$ and $nQ$ coincide if and only if $m = n$ and $P = Q$.
- Addition - The sum of two mass points $mP$ and $nQ$ has mass $m + n$ and point $R$ where $R$ is the point on $PQ$ such that $PR:RQ = n:m$. In other words, $R$ is the fulcrum point that perfectly balances the points $P$ and $Q$. An example of mass point addition is shown at right. Mass point addition is closed, commutative, and associative.
- Scalar Multiplication - Given a mass point $mP$ and a positive real number $k$, we define multiplication to be $k(m, P) = (km, P)$. Mass point scalar multiplication is distributive over mass point addition.

== Methods ==
=== Concurrent cevians ===
First, a point is assigned with a mass (often a whole number, but it depends on the problem) in the way that other masses are also whole numbers. The principle of calculation is that the foot of a cevian is the addition (defined above) of the two vertices (they are the endpoints of the side where the foot lie). For each cevian, the point of concurrency is the sum of the vertex and the foot. Each length ratio may then be calculated from the masses at the points. See Problem One for an example.

=== Splitting masses ===
Splitting masses is the slightly more complicated method necessary when a problem contains transversals in addition to cevians. Any vertex that is on both sides the transversal crosses will have a split mass. A point with a split mass may be treated as a normal mass point, except that it has three masses: one used for each of the two sides it is on, and one that is the sum of the other two split masses and is used for any cevians it may have. See Problem Two for an example.

=== Other methods ===
- Routh's theorem - Many problems involving triangles with cevians will ask for areas, and mass points does not provide a method for calculating areas. However, Routh's theorem, which goes hand in hand with mass points, uses ratios of lengths to calculate the ratio of areas between a triangle and a triangle formed by three cevians.
- Special cevians - When given cevians with special properties, like an angle bisector or an altitude, other theorems may be used alongside mass point geometry that determine length ratios. One very common theorem used likewise is the angle bisector theorem.
- Stewart's theorem - When asked not for the ratios of lengths but for the actual lengths themselves, Stewart's theorem may be used to determine the length of the entire segment, and then mass points may be used to determine the ratios and therefore the necessary lengths of parts of segments.
- Higher dimensions - The methods involved in mass point geometry are not limited to two dimensions; the same methods may be used in problems involving tetrahedra, or even higher-dimensional shapes, though it is rare that a problem involving four or more dimensions will require use of mass points.

== Examples ==
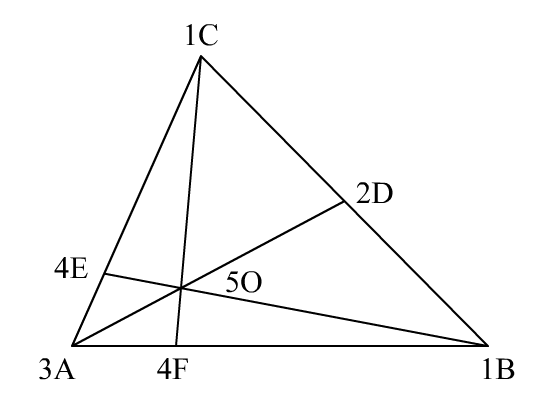
Diagram for solution to Problem One

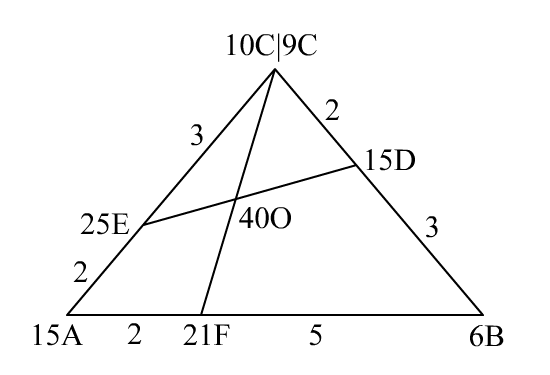
Diagram for solution to Problem Two

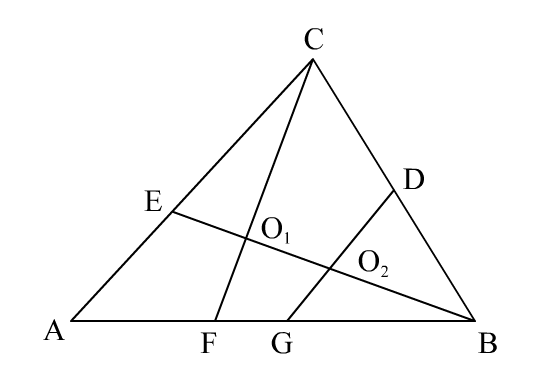
Diagram for Problem Three

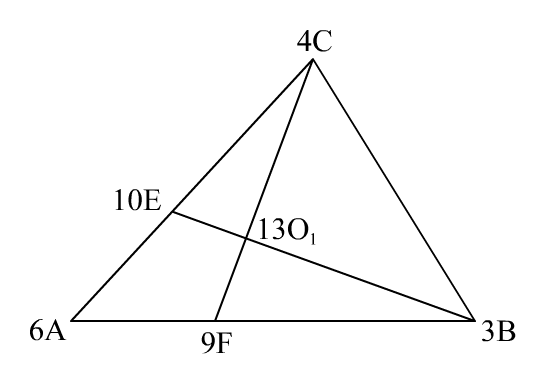
Diagram for Problem Three, System One

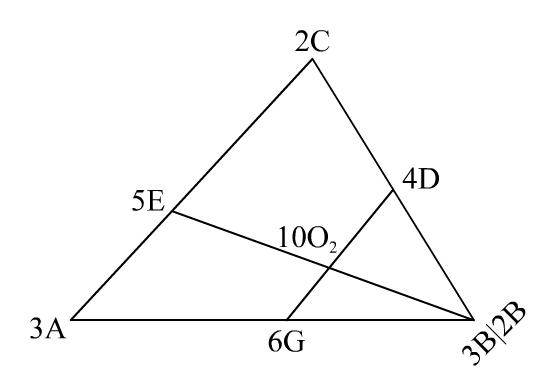
Diagram for Problem Three, System Two

=== Problem One ===
Problem. In triangle $ABC$, $E$ is on $AC$ so that $CE = 3AE$ and $F$ is on $AB$ so that $BF = 3AF$. If $BE$ and $CF$ intersect at $O$ and line $AO$ intersects $BC$ at $D$, compute $\tfrac{OB}{OE}$ and $\tfrac{OD}{OA}$.

Solution. We may arbitrarily assign the mass of point $A$ to be $3$. By ratios of lengths, the masses at $B$ and $C$ must both be $1$. By summing masses, the masses at $E$ and $F$ are both $4$. Furthermore, the mass at $O$ is $4 + 1 = 5$, making the mass at $D$ have to be $5 - 3 = 2$ Therefore $\tfrac{OB}{OE}$ $= 4$ and $\tfrac{OD}{OA} = \tfrac{3}{2}$. See diagram at right.

=== Problem Two ===
Problem. In triangle $ABC$, $D$, $E$, and $F$ are on $BC$, $CA$, and $AB$, respectively, so that $AE = AF = CD = 2$, $BD = CE = 3$, and $BF = 5$. If $DE$ and $CF$ intersect at $O$, compute $\tfrac{OD}{OE}$ and $\tfrac{OC}{OF}$.

Solution. As this problem involves a transversal, we must use split masses on point $C$. We may arbitrarily assign the mass of point $A$ to be $15$. By ratios of lengths, the mass at $B$ must be $6$ and the mass at $C$ is split $10$ towards $A$ and $9$ towards $B$. By summing masses, we get the masses at $D$, $E$, and $F$ to be $15$, $25$, and $21$, respectively. Therefore $\tfrac{OD}{OE} = \tfrac{25}{15} = \tfrac{5}{3}$ and $\tfrac{OC}{OF} = \tfrac{21}{10 + 9} = \tfrac{21}{19}$.

=== Problem Three ===
Problem. In triangle $ABC$, points $D$ and $E$ are on sides $BC$ and $CA$, respectively, and points $F$ and $G$ are on side $AB$ with $G$ between $F$ and $B$. $BE$ intersects $CF$ at point $O_1$ and $BE$ intersects $DG$ at point $O_2$. If $FG = 1$, $AE = AF = DB = DC = 2$, and $BG = CE = 3$, compute $\tfrac{O_1O_2}{BE}$.

Solution. This problem involves two central intersection points, $O_1$ and $O_2$, so we must use multiple systems.

- System One. For the first system, we will choose $O_1$ as our central point, and we may therefore ignore segment $DG$ and points $D$, $G$, and $O_2$. We may arbitrarily assign the mass at $A$ to be $6$, and by ratios of lengths the masses at $B$ and $C$ are $3$ and $4$, respectively. By summing masses, we get the masses at $E$, $F$, and $O_1$ to be 10, 9, and 13, respectively. Therefore, $\tfrac{EO_1}{BO_1} = \tfrac{3}{10}$ and $\tfrac{EO_1}{BE} = \tfrac{3}{13}$.
- System Two. For the second system, we will choose $O_2$ as our central point, and we may therefore ignore segment $CF$ and points $F$ and $O_1$. As this system involves a transversal, we must use split masses on point $B$. We may arbitrarily assign the mass at $A$ to be $3$, and by ratios of lengths, the mass at $C$ is $2$ and the mass at $B$ is split $3$ towards $A$ and 2 towards $C$. By summing masses, we get the masses at $D$, $G$, and $O_2$ to be 4, 6, and 10, respectively. Therefore, $\tfrac{BO_2}{EO_2} = \tfrac{5}{3 + 2} = 1$ and $\tfrac{BO_2}{BE} = \tfrac{1}{2}$.
- Original System. We now know all the ratios necessary to put together the ratio we are asked for. The final answer may be found as follows:
  $$\tfrac{O_1O_2}{BE} = \tfrac{BE - BO_2 - EO_1}{BE} = 1 - \tfrac{BO_2}{BE} - \tfrac{EO_1}{BE} = 1 - \tfrac{1}{2} - \tfrac{3}{13} = \tfrac{7}{26}.$$

== See also ==
- Cevian
- Ceva's theorem
- Menelaus's theorem
- Stewart's theorem
- Angle bisector theorem
- Routh's theorem
- Barycentric coordinates
- Lever
