= Spieker =

Spieker is a surname. Notable people with the name include:

- Bonno Spieker (1935–2017), Dutch politician
- Cole Spieker (born 1996), American football wide receiver
- Franz-Josef Spieker (1933–1978), German filmmaker
- Irene Spieker, American world record holder in the women's pole vault
- Theodor Spieker (1823–1913), German mathematician and teacher

== See also ==
- Spieker center, special point associated with a plane triangle
- Spieker circle, named after German geometer Theodor Spieker
- Spieker Aquatics Center, 2,500-capacity stadium in Los Angeles, California
