= Angle bisector theorem =

Geometrical theorem relating the lengths of two segments that divide a triangle

The theorem states for any triangle ∠ DAB and ∠ DAC where AD is a bisector, then $|BD| : |CD| = |AB| : |AC|.$

In geometry, the angle bisector theorem is concerned with the relative lengths of the two segments that a triangle's side is divided into by a line that bisects the opposite angle. It equates their relative lengths to the relative lengths of the other two sides of the triangle.

== Theorem ==
Consider a triangle △ABC. Let the angle bisector of angle ∠ A intersect side B̅C̅ at a point D between B and C. The angle bisector theorem states that the ratio of the length of the line segment B̅D̅ to the length of segment C̅D̅ is equal to the ratio of the length of side A̅B̅ to the length of side A̅C̅:

$${\frac {|BD|} {|CD|}}={\frac {|AB|}{|AC|}},$$

and conversely, if a point D on the side B̅C̅ of △ABC divides B̅C̅ in the same ratio as the sides A̅B̅ and A̅C̅, then A̅D̅ is the angle bisector of angle ∠ A.

The generalized angle bisector theorem (which is not necessarily an angle bisector theorem, since the angle ∠ A is not necessarily bisected into equal parts) states that if D lies on the line B̅C̅, then

$${\frac {|BD|} {|CD|}}={\frac {|AB|  \sin \angle DAB}{|AC| \sin \angle DAC}}.$$

This reduces to the previous version if A̅D̅ is the bisector of ∠ BAC. When D is external to the segment B̅C̅, directed line segments and directed angles must be used in the calculation.

The angle bisector theorem is commonly used when the angle bisectors and side lengths are known. It can be used in a calculation or in a proof.

An immediate consequence of the theorem is that the angle bisector of the vertex angle of an isosceles triangle will also bisect the opposite side.

== Proofs ==
There exist many different ways of proving the angle bisector theorem. A few of them are shown below.

=== Proof using similar triangles ===
Animated illustration of the angle bisector theorem.

As shown in the accompanying animation, the theorem can be proved using similar triangles. In the version illustrated here, the triangle $\triangle ABC$ gets reflected across a line that is perpendicular to the angle bisector $AD$, resulting in the triangle $\triangle A B_2 C_2$ with bisector $AD_2$. The fact that the bisection-produced angles $\angle BAD$ and $\angle CAD$ are equal means that $BA C_2$ and $CA B_2$ are straight lines. This allows the construction of triangle $\triangle C_2BC$ that is similar to $\triangle ABD$. Because the ratios between corresponding sides of similar triangles are all equal, it follows that $|AB|/|AC_2| = |BD|/|CD|$. However, $AC_2$ was constructed as a reflection of the line $AC$, and so those two lines are of equal length. Therefore, $|AB|/|AC| = |BD|/|CD|$, yielding the result stated by the theorem.

=== Proof using law of sines ===
In the above diagram, use the law of sines on triangles △ABD and △ACD:

${\frac {|AB|} {|BD|}} = {\frac {\sin \angle ADB} {\sin \angle DAB}}$	1

${\frac {|AC|} {|CD|}} = {\frac {\sin \angle ADC} {\sin \angle DAC}}$	2

Angles ∠ ADB and ∠ ADC form a linear pair, that is, they are adjacent supplementary angles. Since supplementary angles have equal sines,

$${{\sin \angle ADB}} = {\sin \angle ADC}.$$

Angles ∠ DAB and ∠ DAC are equal. Therefore, the right hand sides of equations (1) and (2) are equal, so their left hand sides must also be equal.

$${\frac {|BD|} {|CD|}}={\frac {|AB|}{|AC|}},$$

which is the angle bisector theorem.

If angles ∠ DAB, ∠ DAC are unequal, equations (1) and (2) can be re-written as:

$${\frac {|AB|} {|BD|} \sin \angle DAB = \sin \angle ADB},$$
$${\frac {|AC|} {|CD|} \sin \angle DAC = \sin \angle ADC}.$$

Angles ∠ ADB, ∠ ADC are still supplementary, so the right hand sides of these equations are still equal, so we obtain:

$${\frac {|AB|} {|BD|} \sin \angle DAB = \frac {|AC|} {|CD|} \sin \angle DAC},$$

which rearranges to the "generalized" version of the theorem.

=== Proof using triangle altitudes ===

Let D be a point on the line BC, not equal to B or C and such that A̅D̅ is not an altitude of triangle △ABC.

Let B_{1} be the base (foot) of the altitude in the triangle △ABD through B and let C_{1} be the base of the altitude in the triangle △ACD through C. Then, if D is strictly between B and C, one and only one of B_{1} or C_{1} lies inside △ABC and it can be assumed without loss of generality that B_{1} does. This case is depicted in the adjacent diagram. If D lies outside of segment B̅C̅, then neither B_{1} nor C_{1} lies inside the triangle.

∠ DB_{1}B, ∠ DC_{1}C are right angles, while the angles ∠ B_{1}DB, ∠ C_{1}DC are congruent if D lies on the segment B̅C̅ (that is, between B and C) and they are identical in the other cases being considered, so the triangles △DB_{1}B, △DC_{1}C are similar (AAA), which implies that:

$${\frac {|BD|} {|CD|}}= {\frac {|BB_1|}{|CC_1|}} = \frac {|AB|\sin \angle BAD}{|AC|\sin \angle CAD}.$$

If D is the foot of an altitude, then,

$$\frac{|BD|}{|AB|} = \sin \angle \ BAD \text{ and } \frac{|CD|}{|AC|} = \sin \angle \ DAC,$$

and the generalized form follows.

=== Proof using isosceles triangles ===
Construct point $D'$ on the bisector such that $\triangle ABD\sim\triangle ACD'$. We aim to show that $|CD|=|CD'|$.

In the case where $D'$ lies on $\overline{AD}$, we have that
$$\angle CD'D=180^\circ-\angle CD'A=180^\circ-\angle BDA=\angle CDD',$$
and in the case where $D'$ does not lie on $\overline{AD}$, we have that
$$\angle CD'D=\angle CD'A=\angle BDA=\angle CDD'.$$
Either way, $\triangle CDD'$ is isosceles, implying that $|CD|=|CD'|$. Therefore,
$$\frac{|AB|}{|AC|}=\frac{|BD|}{|CD'|}=\frac{|BD|}{|CD|},$$
which was the desired result.

=== Proof using triangle areas ===
$\alpha = \frac{\angle BAC}{2} = \angle BAD = \angle CAD$

A quick proof can be obtained by looking at the ratio of the areas of the two triangles △BAD, △CAD, which are created by the angle bisector in A. Computing those areas twice using different formulas, that is $\tfrac{1}{2}gh$ with base $g$ and altitude h and $\tfrac{1}{2}ab\sin(\gamma)$ with sides a, b and their enclosed angle γ, will yield the desired result.

Let h denote the height of the triangles on base B̅C̅ and $\alpha$ be half of the angle in A. Then

$$\frac{|\triangle ABD|}{|\triangle ACD|} =
\frac{\frac{1}{2}|BD|h}{\frac{1}{2}|CD|h} = \frac{|BD|}{|CD|}$$

and

$$\frac{|\triangle ABD|}{|\triangle ACD|} =
\frac{\frac{1}{2}|AB||AD|\sin(\alpha)}{\frac{1}{2}|AC||AD|\sin(\alpha)} =
\frac{|AB|}{|AC|}$$

yields

$$\frac{|BD|}{|CD|} = \frac{|AB|}{|AC|}.$$

== Length of the angle bisector ==
Diagram of Stewart's theorem

The length of the angle bisector $d$ can be found by $d^2 = bc - mn = m n (k^2-1) = bc \left( 1-\frac{1}{k^2} \right)$,

where $k = \frac b n = \frac c m = \frac{b+c}{a}$ is the constant of proportionality from the angle bisector theorem.

Proof: By Stewart's theorem (which is more general than Apollonius's theorem), we have

$$\begin{align}
b^2 m + c^2 n &= a(d^2 + mn) \\
(kn)^2 m + (km)^2 n &= a(d^2 + mn) \\
k^2 (m+n)mn &= (m+n) (d^2 + mn) \\
k^2 mn &= d^2 + mn \\
(k^2 - 1) mn &= d^2 \\
\end{align}$$

== Exterior angle bisectors ==
exterior angle bisectors (dotted red): Points D, E, F are collinear and the following equations for ratios hold: $\tfrac{|EB|}{|EC|} = \tfrac{|AB|}{|AC|}$, $\tfrac{|FB|}{|FA|} = \tfrac{|CB|}{|CA|}$, $\tfrac{|DA|}{|DC|} = \tfrac{|BA|}{|BC|}$

For the exterior angle bisectors in a non-equilateral triangle there exist similar equations for the ratios of the lengths of triangle sides. More precisely if the exterior angle bisector in A intersects the extended side BC in E, the exterior angle bisector in B intersects the extended side AC in D and the exterior angle bisector in C intersects the extended side AB in F, then the following equations hold:

$\frac{|EB|}{|EC|} = \frac{|AB|}{|AC|}$, $\frac{|FB|}{|FA|} = \frac{|CB|}{|CA|}$, $\frac{|DA|}{|DC|} = \frac{|BA|}{|BC|}$

The three points of intersection between the exterior angle bisectors and the extended triangle sides D, E, F are collinear, that is they lie on a common line.

== History ==
The angle bisector theorem appears as Proposition 3 of Book VI in Euclid's Elements. According to Heath (1956, p. 197 (vol. 2)), the corresponding statement for an external angle bisector was given by Robert Simson who noted that Pappus assumed this result without proof. Heath goes on to say that Augustus De Morgan proposed that the two statements should be combined as follows:

If an angle of a triangle is bisected internally or externally by a straight line which cuts the opposite side or the opposite side produced, the segments of that side will have the same ratio as the other sides of the triangle; and, if a side of a triangle be divided internally or externally so that its segments have the same ratio as the other sides of the triangle, the straight line drawn from the point of section to the angular point which is opposite to the first mentioned side will bisect the interior or exterior angle at that angular point.

== Applications ==
This theorem has been used to prove the following theorems/results:

- Coordinates of the incenter of a triangle
- Circles of Apollonius
