= Trisected perimeter point =

The trisected perimeter point of a 3-4-5 right triangle. For this triangle, C´B = A´C and BA´ = CB´, but that is not the case for triangles of other shapes.

In geometry, given a triangle ABC, there exist unique points A´, B´, and C´ on the sides BC, CA, AB respectively, such that:

- A´, B´, and C´ partition the perimeter of the triangle into three equal-length pieces. That is,

C´B + BA´ = B´A + AC´ = A´C + CB´.

- The three lines AA´, BB´, and CC´ meet in a point, the trisected perimeter point.

This is point X_{369} in Clark Kimberling's Encyclopedia of Triangle Centers. Uniqueness and a formula for the trilinear coordinates of X_{369} were shown by Peter Yff late in the twentieth century. The formula involves the unique real root of a cubic equation.

== See also ==
- Bisected perimeter point
