= Spieker circle =

Inscribed circle of a triangle's medial triangle

Triangle △ABC and its medial triangle Spieker circle of △ABC (incircle of the medial triangle; centered at the Spieker center X_{10}) Cleavers of the triangle (concurrent at the Spieker center)

In geometry, the incircle of the medial triangle of a triangle is the Spieker circle, named after 19th-century German geometer Theodor Spieker. Its center, the Spieker center, in addition to being the incenter of the medial triangle, is the center of mass of the uniform-density boundary of triangle. The Spieker center is also the point where all three cleavers of the triangle (perimeter bisectors with an endpoint at a side's midpoint) intersect each other.

== History ==
The Spieker circle and Spieker center are named after Theodor Spieker, a mathematician and professor from Potsdam, Germany. In 1862, he published Lehrbuch der ebenen geometrie mit übungsaufgaben für höhere lehranstalten, dealing with planar geometry. Due to this publication, influential in the lives of many famous scientists and mathematicians including Albert Einstein, Spieker became the mathematician for whom the Spieker circle and center were named.

== Construction ==
To find the Spieker circle of a triangle, the medial triangle must first be constructed from the midpoints of each side of the original triangle. The circle is then constructed in such a way that each side of the medial triangle is tangent to the circle within the medial triangle, creating the incircle. This circle center is named the Spieker center.

== Nagel points and lines ==
Spieker circles also have relations to Nagel points. The incenter of the triangle and the Nagel point form a line within the Spieker circle. The middle of this line segment is the Spieker center. The Nagel line is formed by the incenter of the triangle, the Nagel point, and the centroid of the triangle. The Spieker center will always lie on this line.

== Nine-point circle and Euler line ==
Spieker circles were first found to be very similar to nine-point circles by Julian Coolidge. At this time, it was not yet identified as the Spieker circle, but is referred to as the "P circle" throughout the book. The nine-point circle with the Euler line and the Spieker circle with the Nagel line are analogous to each other, but are not duals, only having dual-like similarities. One similarity between the nine-point circle and the Spieker circle deals with their construction. The nine-point circle is the circumscribed circle of the medial triangle, while the Spieker circle is the inscribed circle of the medial triangle. With relation to their associated lines, the incenter for the Nagel line relates to the circumcenter for the Euler line. Another analogous pair of points is the Nagel point and the orthocenter, with the Nagel point associated with the Spieker circle and the orthocenter associated with the nine-point circle. In the first case, the splitters of the reference triangle, which pass through the Nagel point, also pass through the tangencies of the Spieker circle with the sides of medial triangle. In the second case, the altitudes of the reference triangle, which pass through the orthocenter, also pass through the intersections of the nine-point circle with the sides of the reference triangle.

=== Spieker conic ===
The nine-point circle with the Euler line was generalized into the nine-point conic. Through a similar process, due to the analogous properties of the two circles, the Spieker circle was also able to be generalized into the Spieker conic. The Spieker conic is still found within the medial triangle and touches each side of the medial triangle, however it does not meet those sides of the triangle at the same points. If lines are constructed from each vertex of the medial triangle to the Nagel point, then the midpoint of each of those lines can be found. Also, the midpoints of each side of the medial triangle are found and connected to the midpoint of the opposite line through the Nagel point. Each of these lines share a common midpoint, S. With each of these lines reflected through S, the result is 6 points within the medial triangle. Draw a conic through any 5 of these reflected points and the conic will touch the final point. This was proven by de Villiers in 2006.

== Spieker radical circle ==
The Spieker radical circle is the circle, centered at the Spieker center, which is orthogonal to the three excircles of the medial triangle.
