= Ceva's theorem =

Theorem about triangles

Ceva's theorem, case 1: the three lines are concurrent at a point O inside △ABC

Ceva's theorem, case 2: the three lines are concurrent at a point O outside △ABC

In Euclidean geometry, Ceva's theorem is a theorem about triangles. Given a triangle △ABC, let the lines AO, BO, CO be drawn from the vertices to a common point O (not on one of the sides of △ABC), to meet opposite sides at D, E, F respectively. (The segments A̅D̅, B̅E̅, C̅F̅ are known as cevians.) Then, using signed lengths of segments,

$$\frac{\overline{AF}}{\overline{FB}}  \cdot \frac{\overline{BD}}{\overline{DC}} \cdot \frac{\overline{CE}}{\overline{EA}} = 1.$$

In other words, the length X̅Y̅ is taken to be positive or negative according to whether X is to the left or right of Y in some fixed orientation of the line. For example, A̅F̅ / F̅B̅ is defined as having positive value when F is between A and B and negative otherwise.

Ceva's theorem is a theorem of affine geometry, in the sense that it may be stated and proved without using the concepts of angles, areas, and lengths (except for the ratio of the lengths of two line segments that are collinear). It is therefore true for triangles in any affine plane over any field.

A slightly adapted converse is also true: If points D, E, F are chosen on BC, AC, AB respectively so that

$$\frac{\overline{AF}}{\overline{FB}}  \cdot \frac{\overline{BD}}{\overline{DC}} \cdot \frac{\overline{CE}}{\overline{EA}} = 1,$$

then AD, BE, CF are concurrent, or all three parallel. The converse is often included as part of the theorem.

The theorem is often attributed to Giovanni Ceva, who published it in his 1678 work De lineis rectis. But it was proven much earlier by Yusuf Al-Mu'taman ibn Hűd, an eleventh-century king of Zaragoza. Ibn Hűd's work, however, had fallen into oblivion, and was rediscovered only in 1985.

Associated with the figures are several terms derived from Ceva's name: cevian (the lines AD, BE, CF are the cevians of O), cevian triangle (the triangle △DEF is the cevian triangle of O); cevian nest, anticevian triangle, Ceva conjugate. (Ceva is pronounced Chay'va; cevian is pronounced chev'ian.)

The theorem is very similar to Menelaus' theorem in that their equations differ only in sign. By re-writing each in terms of cross-ratios, the two theorems may be seen as projective duals.

== Proofs ==
Several proofs of the theorem have been created. Two proofs are given in the following.

The first one is very elementary, using only basic properties of triangle areas. However, several cases have to be considered, depending on the position of the point O.

The second proof uses barycentric coordinates and vectors, but is not case dependent. Moreover, it works in any affine plane over any field.

=== Using triangle areas ===
First, the sign of the left-hand side is positive since either all three of the ratios are positive, the case where O is inside the triangle (upper diagram), or one is positive and the other two are negative, the case O is outside the triangle (lower diagram shows one case).

To check the magnitude, note that the area of a triangle of a given height is proportional to its base. So

$$\frac{|\triangle BOD|}{|\triangle COD|}=\frac{\overline{BD}}{\overline{DC}}=\frac{|\triangle BAD|}{|\triangle CAD|}.$$

Therefore,

$$\frac{\overline{BD}}{\overline{DC}}=
\frac{|\triangle BAD|-|\triangle BOD|}{|\triangle CAD|-|\triangle COD|}
=\frac{|\triangle ABO|}{|\triangle CAO|}.$$

(Replace the minus with a plus if A and O are on opposite sides of BC.) Similarly,

$$\frac{\overline{CE}}{\overline{EA}}=\frac{|\triangle BCO|}{|\triangle ABO|},$$

and

$$\frac{\overline{AF}}{\overline{FB}}=\frac{|\triangle CAO|}{|\triangle BCO|}.$$

Multiplying these three equations gives

$$\left|\frac{\overline{AF}}{\overline{FB}}  \cdot \frac{\overline{BD}}{\overline{DC}} \cdot \frac{\overline{CE}}{\overline{EA}} \right|= 1,$$

as required.

The theorem can also be proven easily using Menelaus's theorem. From the transversal BOE of triangle △ACF,

$$\frac{\overline{AB}}{\overline{BF}} \cdot \frac{\overline{FO}}{\overline{OC}} \cdot \frac{\overline{CE}}{\overline{EA}} = -1$$

and from the transversal AOD of triangle △BCF,

$$\frac{\overline{BA}}{\overline{AF}} \cdot \frac{\overline{FO}}{\overline{OC}} \cdot \frac{\overline{CD}}{\overline{DB}} = -1.$$

The theorem follows by dividing these two equations.

The converse follows as a corollary. Let D, E, F be given on the lines BC, AC, AB so that the equation holds. Let AD, BE meet at O and let F' be the point where CO crosses AB. Then by the theorem, the equation also holds for D, E, F'. Comparing the two,

$$\frac{\overline{AF}}{\overline{FB}} = \frac{\overline{AF'}}{\overline{F'B}}$$

But at most one point can cut a segment in a given ratio so F = F’.

=== Using barycentric coordinates ===
Given three points A, B, C that are not collinear, and a point O, that belongs to the same plane, the barycentric coordinates of O with respect of A, B, C are the unique three numbers $\lambda_A, \lambda_B, \lambda_C$ such that

$$\lambda_A + \lambda_B + \lambda_C =1,$$

and

$$\overrightarrow{XO}=\lambda_A\overrightarrow{XA} + \lambda_B\overrightarrow{XB} + \lambda_C\overrightarrow{XC},$$

for every point X (for the definition of this arrow notation and further details, see Affine space).

For Ceva's theorem, the point O is supposed to not belong to any line passing through two vertices of the triangle. This implies that $\lambda_A \lambda_B \lambda_C\ne 0.$

If one takes for X the intersection F of the lines AB and OC (see figures), the last equation may be rearranged into

$$\overrightarrow{FO}-\lambda_C\overrightarrow{FC}=\lambda_A\overrightarrow{FA} + \lambda_B\overrightarrow{FB}.$$

The left-hand side of this equation is a vector that has the same direction as the line CF, and the right-hand side has the same direction as the line AB. These lines have different directions since A, B, C are not collinear. It follows that the two members of the equation equal the zero vector, and

$$\lambda_A\overrightarrow{FA} + \lambda_B\overrightarrow{FB}=\overrightarrow{0}.$$

It follows that

$$\frac{\overline{AF}}{\overline{FB}}=\frac{\lambda_B}{\lambda_A},$$

where the left-hand-side fraction is the signed ratio of the lengths of the collinear line segments A̅F̅ and F̅B̅.

The same reasoning shows

$$\frac{\overline{BD}}{\overline{DC}}=\frac{\lambda_C}{\lambda_B}\quad \text{and}\quad \frac{\overline{CE}}{\overline{EA}}=\frac{\lambda_A}{\lambda_C}.$$

Ceva's theorem results immediately by taking the product of the three last equations.

== Generalizations ==
The theorem can be generalized to higher-dimensional simplexes using barycentric coordinates. Define a cevian of an n-simplex as a ray from each vertex to a point on the opposite (n − 1)-face (facet). Then the cevians are concurrent if and only if a mass distribution can be assigned to the vertices such that each cevian intersects the opposite facet at its center of mass. Moreover, the intersection point of the cevians is the center of mass of the simplex.

Another generalization to higher-dimensional simplexes extends the conclusion of Ceva's theorem that the product of certain ratios is 1. Starting from a point in a simplex, a point is defined inductively on each k-face. This point is the foot of a cevian that goes from the vertex opposite the k-face, in a (k + 1)-face that contains it, through the point already defined on this (k + 1)-face. Each of these points divides the face on which it lies into lobes. Given a cycle of pairs of lobes, the product of the ratios of the volumes of the lobes in each pair is 1.

Routh's theorem gives the area of the triangle formed by three cevians in the case that they are not concurrent. Ceva's theorem can be obtained from it by setting the area equal to zero and solving.

The analogue of the theorem for general polygons in the plane has been known since the early nineteenth century. The theorem has also been generalized to triangles on other surfaces of constant curvature.

The theorem also has a well-known generalization to spherical and hyperbolic geometry, replacing the lengths in the ratios with their sines and hyperbolic sines, respectively.

== See also ==
- Projective geometry
- Median (geometry) – an application
- Circumcevian triangle
- Menelaus's theorem
- Triangle
- Stewart's theorem
- Cevian
