= Mass point =

Mass point may refer to:

- Mass point geometry
- Point mass in physics
- The values of a probability mass function in probability and statistics
