= One-seventh area triangle =

Geometric construction of a smaller triangle

The area of the pink triangle is one-seventh of the area of the large triangle ABC.

In plane geometry, a triangle ABC contains a triangle having one-seventh of the area of ABC, which is formed as follows: the sides of this triangle lie on cevians p, q, r where

p connects A to a point on BC that is one-third the distance from B to C,
q connects B to a point on CA that is one-third the distance from C to A,
r connects C to a point on AB that is one-third the distance from A to B.

The proof of the existence of the one-seventh area triangle follows from the construction of six parallel lines:

two parallel to p, one through C, the other through q.r
two parallel to q, one through A, the other through r.p
two parallel to r, one through B, the other through p.q.

The suggestion of Hugo Steinhaus is that the (central) triangle with sides p,q,r be reflected in its sides and vertices. These six extra triangles partially cover ABC, and leave six overhanging extra triangles lying outside ABC. Focusing on the parallelism of the full construction (offered by Martin Gardner through James Randi’s on-line magazine), the pair-wise congruences of overhanging and missing pieces of ABC is evident. As seen in the graphical solution, six plus the original equals the whole triangle ABC.

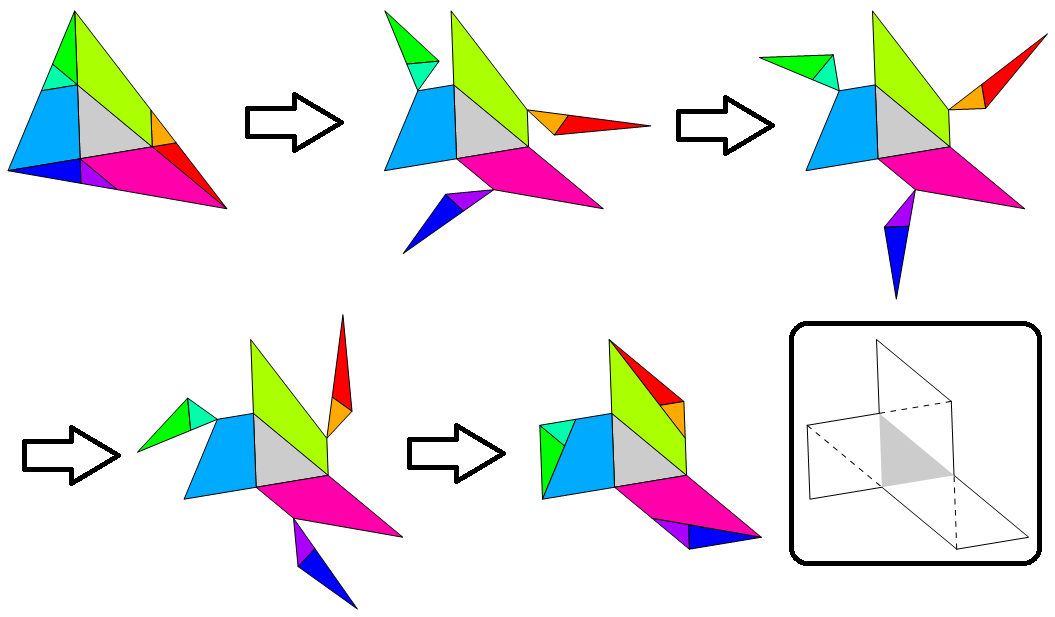
Congruence of edge lengths allows rotation of the selected triangles to form three equal-area parallelograms, which bisect into six triangles of equal size to the original interior triangle.

An early exhibit of this geometrical construction and area computation was given by Robert Potts in 1859 in his Euclidean geometry textbook.

According to Cook and Wood (2004), this triangle puzzled Richard Feynman in a dinner conversation; they go on to give four different proofs.

A more general result is known as Routh's theorem. Also see Marion Walter’s theorem.
