= Cevian =

Line intersecting both a vertex and opposite edge of a triangle

In geometry, a cevian is a line segment which joins a vertex of a triangle to a point on the opposite side of the triangle. Medians, symmedians, angle bisectors, altitudes are all special cases of cevians. The name cevian comes from the Italian mathematician Giovanni Ceva, who proved a theorem about cevians which also bears his name.

== Length ==
A triangle with a cevian of length d

=== Stewart's theorem ===
The length of a cevian can be determined by Stewart's theorem: in the diagram, the cevian length d is given by the formula

$$\,b^2m + c^2n = a(d^2 + mn).$$

Less commonly, this is also represented (with some rearrangement) by the following mnemonic:

$\underset{\text{A }man\text{ and his }dad}{man\ +\ dad} = \!\!\!\!\!\! \underset{\text{put a }bomb\text{ in the }sink.}{bmb\ +\ cnc}$

=== Median ===
If the cevian happens to be a median (thus bisecting a side), its length can be determined from the formula

$$\,m(b^2 + c^2) = a(d^2 + m^2)$$

or

$$\,2(b^2 + c^2) = 4d^2 + a^2$$

since

$$\,a = 2m.$$

Hence in this case

$$d= \frac\sqrt{2 b^2 + 2 c^2 - a^2}2 .$$

=== Angle bisector ===
If the cevian happens to be an angle bisector, its length obeys the formulas

$$\,(b + c)^2 = a^2 \left( \frac{d^2}{mn} + 1 \right),$$

and

$$d^2+mn = bc$$

and

$$d= \frac{2 \sqrt{bcs(s-a)}}{b+c}$$

where the semiperimeter $s = \tfrac{a+b+c}{2}.$

The side of length a is divided in the proportion b : c.

=== Altitude ===
If the cevian happens to be an altitude and thus perpendicular to a side, its length obeys the formulas

$$\,d^2 = b^2 - n^2 = c^2 - m^2$$

and

$$d=\frac{2\sqrt{s(s-a)(s-b)(s-c)}}{a},$$

where the semiperimeter $s = \tfrac{a+b+c}{2}.$

== Ratio properties ==
Three cevians passing through a common point

There are various properties of the ratios of lengths formed by three cevians all passing through the same arbitrary interior point: Referring to the diagram at right,

$$\begin{align}
& \frac{\overline{AF}}{\overline{FB}}  \cdot \frac{\overline{BD}}{\overline{DC}} \cdot \frac{\overline{CE}}{\overline{EA}} = 1 \\
& \\
& \frac{\overline{AO}}{\overline{OD}} = \frac{\overline{AE}}{\overline{EC}} + \frac{\overline{AF}}{\overline{FB}}; \\
& \\
& \frac{\overline{OD}}{\overline{AD}} + \frac{\overline{OE}}{\overline{BE}} + \frac{\overline{OF}}{\overline{CF}} = 1; \\
& \\
& \frac{\overline{AO}}{\overline{AD}} + \frac{\overline{BO}}{\overline{BE}} + \frac{\overline{CO}}{\overline{CF}} = 2.
\end{align}$$

The first property is known as Ceva's theorem. The last two properties are equivalent because summing the two equations gives the identity 1 + 1 + 1 = 3.

== Splitter ==
A splitter of a triangle is a cevian that bisects the perimeter. The three splitters concur at the Nagel point of the triangle.

== Area bisectors ==
Three of the area bisectors of a triangle are its medians, which connect the vertices to the opposite side midpoints. The medians all contain the centroid, which happens to lie at their common point of intersection, so that a uniform-density triangle would in principle balance on a razor supporting any of the medians.

== Angle trisectors ==
If from each vertex of a triangle two cevians are drawn so as to trisect the angle (divide it into three equal angles), then the six cevians intersect in pairs to form an equilateral triangle, called the Morley triangle.

== Area of inner triangle formed by cevians ==
Routh's theorem determines the ratio of the area of a given triangle to that of a triangle formed by the pairwise intersections of three cevians, one from each vertex.

== See also ==
- Mass point geometry
- Menelaus' theorem
