= Mandart inellipse =

Inellipse tangent where the triangle's excircles touch its sides

Arbitrary triangle Mandart inellipse (centered at mittenpunkt M) Lines from triangle's excenters to each corresponding edge midpoint (concur at M) Splitters (concur at Nagel point N)

In geometry, the Mandart inellipse of a triangle is an ellipse that is inscribed within the triangle, tangent to its sides at the contact points of its excircles (which are also the vertices of the extouch triangle and the endpoints of the splitters). The Mandart inellipse is named after H. Mandart, who studied it in two papers published in the late 19th century.

== Parameters ==
As an inconic, the Mandart inellipse is described by the parameters

$$x:y:z=\frac{a}{b+c-a}:\frac{b}{a+c-b}:\frac{c}{a+b-c}$$

where a, b, and c are sides of the given triangle.

== Related points ==
The center of the Mandart inellipse is the mittenpunkt of the triangle. The three lines connecting the triangle vertices to the opposite points of tangency all meet in a single point, the Nagel point of the triangle.

== See also ==
- Steiner inellipse, a different ellipse tangent to a triangle at the midpoints of its sides
