= Giovanni Ceva =

Italian mathematician (1647–1734)

- Born: 1 September 1647; Milan, Duchy of Milan
- Died: 13 May 1734 (aged 86); Mantua, Duchy of Milan
- Citizenship: Duchy of Milan
- Education: Brera College, Milan; University of Pisa
- Occupations: Mathematician; University teacher; Civil servant
- Known for: Ceva's theorem
- Spouse: Paola Columbo (m. 1639)
- Relatives: Tommaso Ceva (brother)
- Scientific career
- Fields: Geometry
- Workplaces: University of Pisa; University of Mantua
- Academic advisors: Alessandro Marchetti

Giovanni Ceva (September 1, 1647 – May 13, 1734) was an Italian mathematician widely known for proving Ceva's theorem in elementary geometry. His brother, Tommaso Ceva, was also a well-known poet and mathematician.

== Life ==
Ceva was born in Milan in 1647 and received his first education at the Brera College, the Jesuit school in Milan. His brother Tommaso was to become a distinguished teacher of this college, as well as a humanist and a mathematician of renown. Unlike Tommaso, Giovanni left the Brera College and went to the University of Pisa where he studied mathematics and geometry under the guidance of Donato Rossetti and Alessandro Marchetti, both pupils of Borelli. In Pisa he befriended the mathematician Michelangelo Ricci, a pupil of Castelli and a friend of Torricelli.

After teaching for a brief period at the University of Pisa, Ceva went back to Milan, where he published in 1678 the De lineis rectis se invicem secantibus statica constructio and, in 1682, the Opuscula mathematica de potentiis obliquis, de pendulis, de vasis et de fluminibus. By 1684 Ceva had settled in Mantua as mathematician and engineer at the Gonzaga court. He was designated as the Professor of Mathematics at the University of Mantua in 1686. Ceva continued to undertake mathematical research until the end of his life. He corresponded with many of the leading scientists of the day, including Vincenzo Viviani and Giovanni Girolamo Saccheri.

Giovanni Ceva died in Mantua on May 13, 1734 and was buried in the church of St. Teresa de Carmelitani Scalzi. The 6.5-kilometer sized main-belt asteroid 12579 Ceva, discovered at the San Vittore Observatory in 1999, was named in honor of him and his brother, Tommaso.

== Work ==
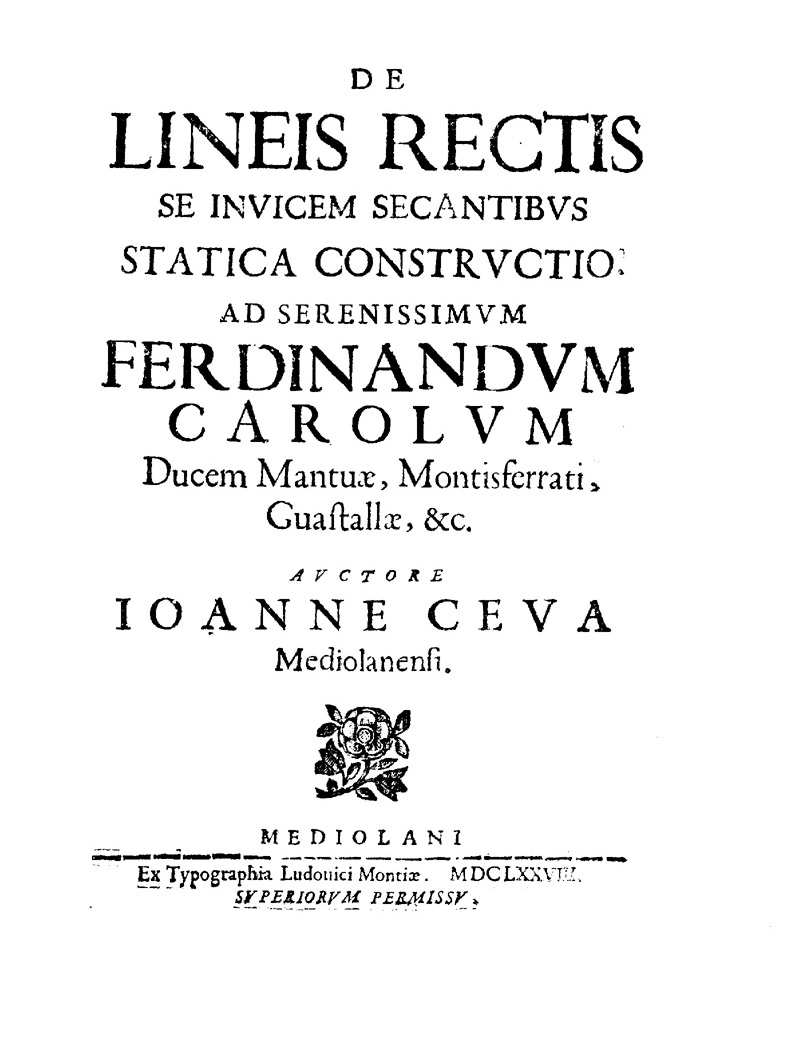
De lineis rectis se invicem secantibus statica constructio, 1678

Ceva studied geometry for most of his long life. In 1678, he published a now famous theorem on synthetic geometry in a triangle called Ceva's Theorem. The theorem states that if three line segments are drawn from the vertices of a triangle to the opposite sides, then the three line segments are concurrent if, and only if, the product of the ratios of the newly created line segments on each side of the triangle is equal to one. Ceva published this theorem in De lineis rectis. The theorem was already known to Yusuf Al-Mu'taman ibn Hűd in 11th century but had by then fallen into oblivion and was unknown in the West.

Ceva also rediscovered and published Menelaus's theorem. He published Opuscula mathematica in 1682 and Geometria Motus in 1692, as well. In Geometria Motus, he anticipated the infinitesimal calculus. Finally, Ceva wrote De Re Nummaria in 1711, which was one of the first books in mathematical economics.

Giovanni Ceva also studied applications of mechanics and statics to geometric systems. At one point, however, he incorrectly resolved that the periods of oscillation of two pendulums were in the same ratio as their lengths, but he later realized and corrected the error. Ceva also worked on hydraulics. In 1728, he published Opus hydrostaticum which discusses his work in hydraulics. In fact, he used his knowledge of hydraulics to stop a project from diverting the river Reno into the river Po.

=== List of works ===
- De lineis rectis se invicem secantibus statica constructio (in Latin). Mediolani: ex typographia Ludouici Montiae. 1678.
- Opuscula mathematica (in Latin). Mediolani: ex typographia Ludouici Montiae. 1682.
- Geometria Motus, 1692
- De re numaria quo ad fieri potuit geometrice tractata (in Latin). Mantova: Alberto Pazzoni. 1711.
- Ragioni del signor Giovanni Ceva commissario dell'arciducal Camera di Mantova, e del signor Doriciglio Moscatelli Battaglia prefetto dell'acque di quello stato contra l'introduzione del Reno nel Pò grande con la risposta alle medesime di Eustachio Manfredi matematico dell'Università di Bologna. Che contiene una piena informazione sopra i capi principali di questa materia. In Bologna: per li successori del Benacci. 1716.
- Replica di Giovanni Ceva, commissario dell'arciducal camera di Mantova, e matematico di s.m. ces., e cat. in difesa delle sue dimostrazioni, e ragioni per la quali non debbasi introdurre Reno in Po, contro la risposta datasi dal sig. dottor Eustachio Manfredi. In Mantova: per Alberto Pazzoni stampatore arciducale. 1717.
- Opus hydrostaticum (in Latin). Mantuae: Alberto Pazzoni. 1728.
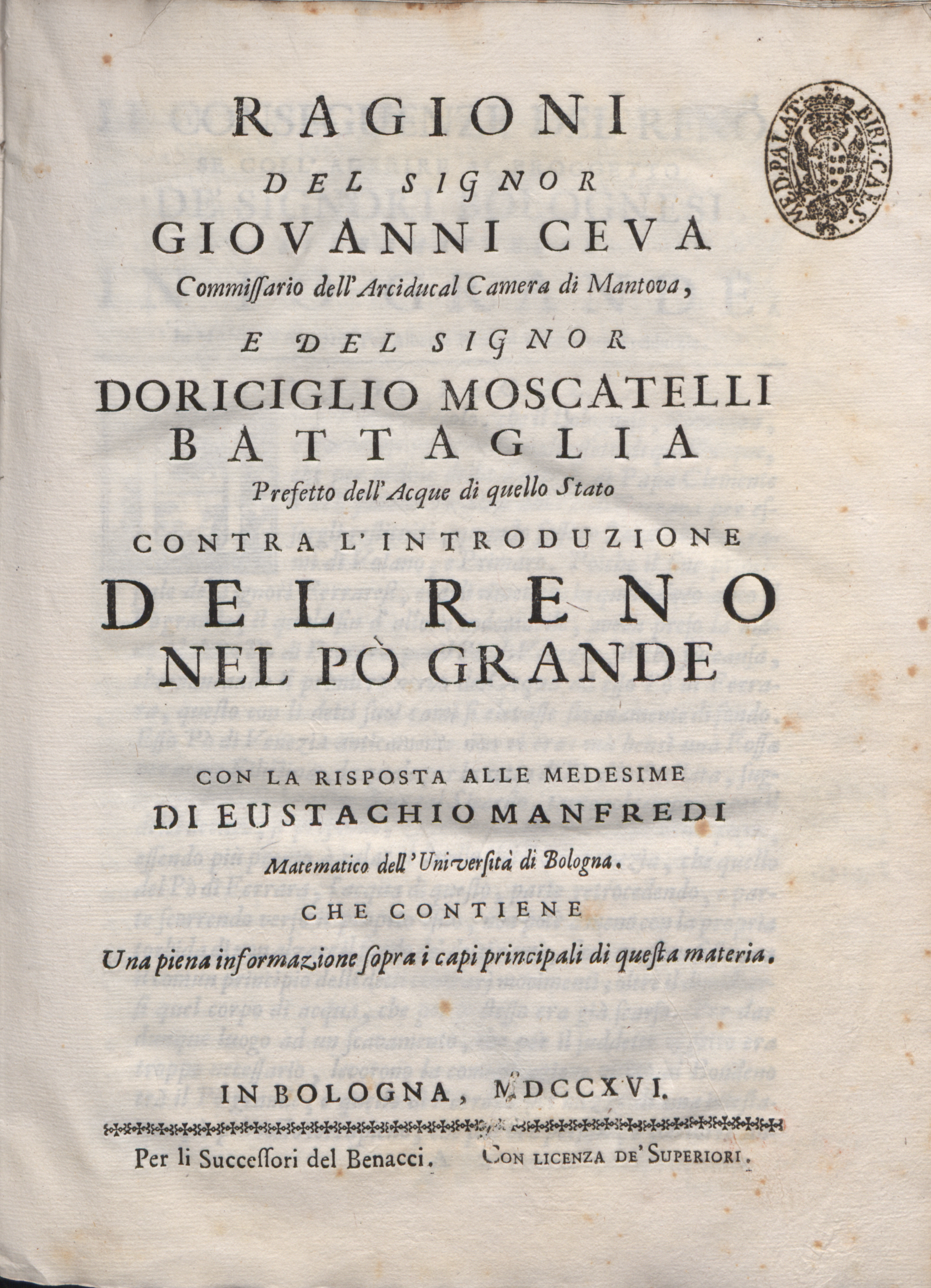
Ragioni [...] contra l'introduzione del Reno nel Pò, 1716

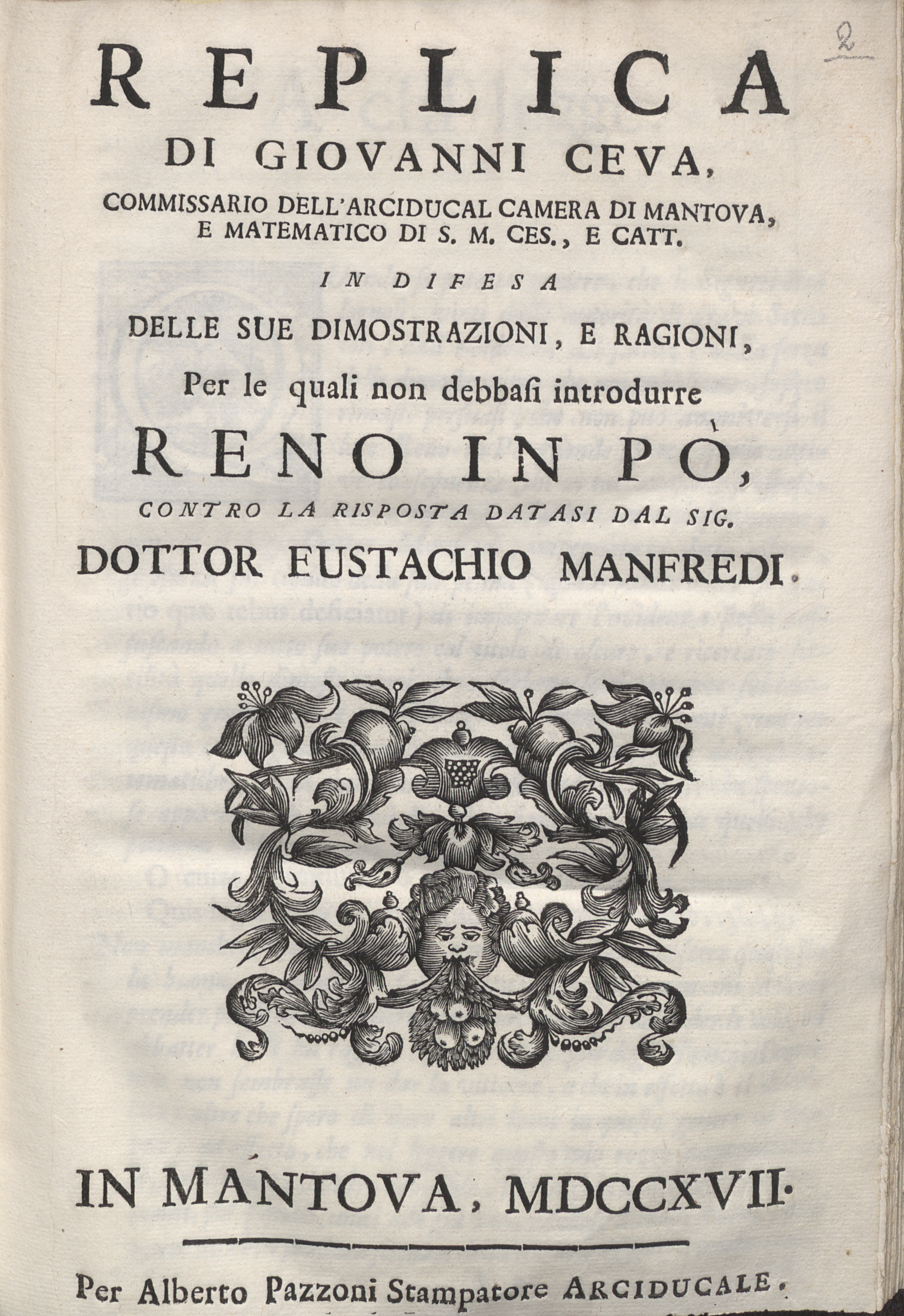
Replica [...] in difesa delle sue dimostrazioni, e ragioni per la quali non debbasi introdurre Reno in Po, 1717

== See also ==
- Cevian

== Bibliography ==
- O'Connor, John J.; Robertson, Edmund F., "Giovanni Ceva", MacTutor History of Mathematics Archive, University of St Andrews
- Clara Silvia Roero, Giovanni Ceva at the Encyclopædia Britannica
- "Cèva, Giovanni". Enciclopedia on line (in Italian). Rome: Istituto dell'Enciclopedia Italiana.
- Loria, Gino (1915). "Per la biografia de Giovanni Ceva". Rendiconti dell'istituto Lombardo di Scienze e Lettere. 48: 450–452.
- Baldini, Ugo (1980). "CEVA, Giovanni". Dizionario Biografico degli Italiani (in Italian). Vol. 24: Cerreto–Chini. Rome: Istituto dell'Enciclopedia Italiana. ISBN 978-88-12-00032-6.
- Oettel, Herbert (1981). "Ceva, Giovanni". In Charles Coulston Gillispie (ed.). Dictionary of Scientific Biography. Vol. III. New York: Charles Scribner's Sons. pp. 182–183.
- Nastasi, Pietro; Brigaglia, Aldo (1984). "Le soluzioni di Girolamo Saccheri e Giovanni Ceva al 'Geometram quaero' di Ruggero Ventimiglia: Geometria proiettiva italiana nel tardo seicento" [The solutions of Girolamo Saccheri and Giovanni Ceva to Ruggero Ventimiglia's 'Geometram quaero': Italian projective geometry in the late seventeenth century]. Archive for History of Exact Sciences. 30 (1): 7–44. doi:10.1007/BF00348433.
