= Extouch triangle =

Triangle formed from the points of tangency of a given triangle's excircles

Arbitrary triangle △ABC Excircles, tangent to the sides of △ABC at T_{A}, T_{B}, T_{C} Extouch triangle △T_{A}T_{B}T_{C} Splitters of the perimeter A̅T̅_{A}, B̅T̅_{B}, C̅T̅_{C}; intersect at the Nagel point N

In Euclidean geometry, the extouch triangle of a triangle is formed by joining the points at which the three excircles touch the triangle.

== Coordinates ==
The vertices of the extouch triangle are given in trilinear coordinates by:

$$\begin{array}{rccccc}
T_A =& 0 &:& \csc^2 \frac{B}{2} &:& \csc^2 \frac{C}{2} \\
T_B =& \csc^2 \frac{A}{2} &:& 0 &:& \csc^2 \frac{C}{2} \\
T_C =& \csc^2 \frac{A}{2} &:& \csc^2 \frac{B}{2} &:& 0
\end{array}$$

or equivalently, where a, b, c are the lengths of the sides opposite angles A, B, C respectively,

$$\begin{array}{rccccc}
T_A =& 0 &:& \frac{a \, - \, b \, + \, c}{b} &:& \frac{a \, + \, b \, - \, c}{c} \\
T_B =& \frac{-a \, + \, b \, + \, c}{a} &:& 0 &:& \frac{a \, + \, b \, - \, c}{c} \\
T_C =& \frac{-a \, + \, b \, + \, c}{a} &:&  \frac{a \, - \, b \, + \, c}{b} &:& 0
\end{array}$$

Also, with s denoting the semiperimeter of the triangle, the vertices of the extouch triangle are given in barycentric coordinates by:

$$\begin{array}{rccccc}
T_A =& 0 &:& s-b &:& s-c \\
T_B =& s-a &:& 0 &:& s-c \\
T_C =& s-a &:&  s-b &:& 0
\end{array}$$

== Related figures ==
The triangle's splitters are lines connecting the vertices of the original triangle to the corresponding vertices of the extouch triangle; they bisect the triangle's perimeter and meet at the Nagel point. This is shown in blue and labelled "N" in the diagram.

The Mandart inellipse is tangent to the sides of the reference triangle at the three vertices of the extouch triangle.

== Area ==
The area of the extouch triangle, K_{T}, is given by:

$$K_T= K\frac{2r^2s}{abc}$$

where K and r are the area and radius of the incircle, s is the semiperimeter of the original triangle, and a, b, c are the side lengths of the original triangle.

This is the same area as that of the intouch triangle.
