= Cleaver (geometry) =

Line segment from a midpoint of a triangle side which bisects its perimeter

Construction of the Spieker center via cleavers. Reference triangle △ABC Angle bisectors (concur at incenter I) Cleavers (concur at Spieker center S) Medial triangle △DEF Inscribed circle of △DEF (Spieker circle, centered at S)

In geometry, a cleaver of a triangle is a line segment that bisects the perimeter of the triangle and has one endpoint at the midpoint of one of the three sides. They are not to be confused with splitters, which also bisect the perimeter, but with an endpoint on one of the triangle's vertices instead of its sides.

== Construction ==
Each cleaver through the midpoint of one of the sides of a triangle is parallel to the angle bisectors at the opposite vertex of the triangle.

The broken chord theorem of Archimedes provides another construction of the cleaver. Suppose the triangle to be bisected is △ABC, and that one endpoint of the cleaver is the midpoint of side A̅B̅. Form the circumcircle of △ABC and let M be the midpoint of the arc of the circumcircle from A through C to B. Then the other endpoint of the cleaver is the closest point of the triangle to M, and can be found by dropping a perpendicular from M to the longer of the two sides A̅C̅ and B̅C̅.

== Related figures ==
The three cleavers concur at a point, the center of the Spieker circle.

== See also ==
- Splitter (geometry)
