= Christian Heinrich von Nagel =

German mathematician (1803–1882)

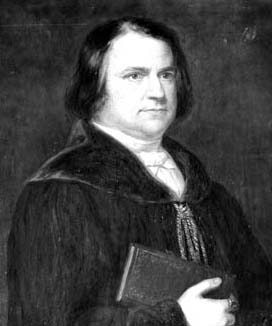
Christian Heinrich von Nagel

Christian Heinrich von Nagel (28 February 1803 in Stuttgart, Germany – 27 October 1882 in Ulm, Germany) was a German geometer.

After attending the gymnasium, Nagel went in 1817 to Evangelical Seminaries of Maulbronn and Blaubeuren. From 1821 to 1825, he took a four-year course of theology at the Tübinger Stift. Soon after his graduation, he became interested in mathematics. He became mathematics and science teacher at the Lyceum and at the Secondary school in Tübingen. Already in 1826, he earned doctorate at the local Faculty of Philosophy on a theme De triangulis rectangulis ex algebraica aequatione construendis (About right triangles construable from an algebraic equation). Until 1830, he held post of a private lecturer in Tübingen. In that year, he moved to Ulm where he had a better-paid job as a teacher at the Gymnasium in Ulm. Later he was rector of the affiliated Realschule. He was ennobled in 1875.

His best known results are from triangle geometry. One of the notable triangle points, Nagel point, is named after him.

== Works ==
- De triangulis rectangulis ex algebraica aequatione construendis (About right triangles construable from an algebraic equation), 1826
- Untersuchungen über die wichtigsten zum Dreiecke gehöhrigen Kreise. Eine Abhandlung aus dem Gebiete der reinen Geometrie (Studies on the most important circles of the triangles. A treatise from the field of pure geometry), Leipzig, 1836
