= Theodor Spieker =

German mathematician (1823–1913)

Theodor Spieker (8 August 1823 – 9 April 1913) was a German mathematician, a teacher at a gymnasium in Potsdam.

Spieker's geometry textbook Lehrbuch der ebenen Geometrie mit Übungs-Aufgaben für höhere Lehranstalten (Verlag von August Stein, Potsdam, 1862) was republished in many editions. A copy of this textbook was given to Albert Einstein by his tutor when Einstein was twelve, and quickly led Einstein to become interested in higher mathematics.

Spieker is the namesake of the Spieker circle of a triangle (the circle inscribed in its medial triangle) and the Spieker center (the center of the Spieker circle).
