= Apollonius's theorem =

Relates the length of a median of a triangle to the lengths of its sides

green area + blue area = red area

Pythagoras as a special case: green area = red area

In geometry, Apollonius's theorem is a theorem relating the length of a median of a triangle to the lengths of its sides. It states that the sum of the squares of any two sides of any triangle equals twice the square on half the third side plus twice the square on the median bisecting the third side.

The theorem is found as proposition VII.122 of Pappus of Alexandria's Collection (c. 340 AD). It may have been in Apollonius of Perga's lost treatise Plane Loci (c. 200 BC), and was included in Robert Simson's 1749 reconstruction of that work.

== Statement and relation to other theorem ==
In any triangle $ABC,$ if $AD$ is a median ($|BD| = |CD|$), then
$$|AB|^2+|AC|^2=2(|BD|^2+|AD|^2).$$
It is a special case of Stewart's theorem. For an isosceles triangle with $|AB| = |AC|,$ the median $AD$ is perpendicular to $BC$ and the theorem reduces to the Pythagorean theorem for triangle $ADB$ (or triangle $ADC$). From the fact that the diagonals of a parallelogram bisect each other, the theorem is equivalent to the parallelogram law.

== Proof ==
Proof of Apollonius's theorem

The theorem can be proved as a special case of Stewart's theorem, or can be proved using vectors (see parallelogram law). The following is an independent proof using the law of cosines.

Let the triangle have sides $a, b, c$ with a median $d$ drawn to side $a.$ Let $m$ be the length of the segments of $a$ formed by the median, so $m$ is half of $a.$ Let the angles formed between $a$ and $d$ be $\theta$ and $\theta^{\prime},$ where $\theta$ includes $b$ and $\theta^{\prime}$ includes $c.$ Then $\theta^{\prime}$ is the supplement of $\theta$ and $\cos \theta^{\prime} = - \cos \theta.$ The law of cosines for $\theta$ and $\theta^{\prime}$ states that
$$\begin{align}
b^2 &= m^2 + d^2 - 2dm\cos\theta \\
c^2 &= m^2 + d^2 - 2dm\cos\theta' \\
&= m^2 + d^2 + 2dm\cos\theta.\, \end{align}$$

Add the first and third equations to obtain
$$b^2 + c^2 = 2(m^2 + d^2)$$
as required.

== See also ==
- Formulas involving the medians' lengths – Line segment joining a triangle's vertex to the midpoint of the opposite side
