= Transversal (geometry) =

Line intersecting 2 coplanar lines at 2 points

In geometry, a transversal is a line that passes through two lines in the same plane at two distinct points. Transversals play a role in establishing whether two or more other lines in the Euclidean plane are parallel. The intersections of a transversal with two lines create various types of pairs of angles: vertical angles, consecutive interior angles, consecutive exterior angles, corresponding angles, alternate interior angles, alternate exterior angles, and linear pairs. As a consequence of Euclid's parallel postulate, if the two lines are parallel, consecutive angles and linear pairs are supplementary, while corresponding angles, alternate angles, and vertical angles are equal. Usually, transversals are parallel.

Eight angles of a transversal. (Vertical angles such as $\alpha$ and $\gamma$ are always congruent.)	Transversal between non-parallel lines. Consecutive angles are not supplementary.	Transversal between parallel lines. Consecutive angles are supplementary.

== Angles of a transversal ==
A transversal produces 8 angles, as shown in the graph at the above left:

- 4 with each of the two lines, namely α, β, γ and δ and then α_{1}, β_{1}, γ_{1} and δ_{1}; and
- 4 of which are interior (between the two lines), namely α, β, γ_{1} and δ_{1} and 4 of which are exterior, namely α_{1}, β_{1}, γ and δ.

A transversal that cuts two parallel lines at right angles is called a perpendicular transversal. In this case, all 8 angles are right angles

When the lines are parallel, a case that is often considered, a transversal produces several congruent supplementary angles. Some of these angle pairs have specific names and are discussed below: corresponding angles, alternate angles, and consecutive angles.

=== Alternate angles ===
One pair of alternate angles. With parallel lines, they are congruent.

Alternate angles are the four pairs of angles that:

- have distinct vertex points,
- lie on opposite sides of the transversal and
- both angles are interior or both angles are exterior.

If the two angles of one pair are congruent (equal in measure), then the angles of each of the other pairs are also congruent.

Proposition 1.27 of Euclid's Elements, a theorem of absolute geometry (hence valid in both hyperbolic and Euclidean Geometry), proves that if the angles of a pair of alternate angles of a transversal are congruent then the two lines are parallel (non-intersecting).

It follows from Euclid's parallel postulate that if the two lines are parallel, then the angles of a pair of alternate angles of a transversal are congruent (Proposition 1.29 of Euclid's Elements).

=== Corresponding angles ===
One pair of corresponding angles. With parallel lines, they are congruent.

Corresponding angles are the four pairs of angles that:

- have distinct vertex points,
- lie on the same side of the transversal and
- one angle is interior and the other is exterior.

Two lines are parallel if and only if the two angles of any pair of corresponding angles of any transversal are congruent (equal in measure).

Proposition 1.28 of Euclid's Elements, a theorem of absolute geometry (hence valid in both hyperbolic and Euclidean Geometry), proves that if the angles of a pair of corresponding angles of a transversal are congruent then the two lines are parallel (non-intersecting).

It follows from Euclid's parallel postulate that if the two lines are parallel, then the angles of a pair of corresponding angles of a transversal are congruent (Proposition 1.29 of Euclid's Elements).

If the angles of one sateur of corresponding angles are congruent, then the angles of each of the other pairs are also congruent. In the various images with parallel lines on this page, corresponding angle pairs are: α=α_{1}, β=β_{1}, γ=γ_{1} and δ=δ_{1}.

=== Consecutive interior angles ===
One pair of consecutive angles. With parallel lines, they add up to two right angles

Consecutive interior angles are the two pairs of angles that:

- have distinct vertex points,
- lie on the same side of the transversal and
- are both interior.

Two lines are parallel if and only if the two angles of any pair of consecutive interior angles of any transversal are supplementary (sum to 180°).

Proposition 1.28 of Euclid's Elements, a theorem of absolute geometry (hence valid in both hyperbolic and Euclidean Geometry), proves that if the angles of a pair of consecutive interior angles are supplementary then the two lines are parallel (non-intersecting).

It follows from Euclid's parallel postulate that if the two lines are parallel, then the angles of a pair of consecutive interior angles of a transversal are supplementary (Proposition 1.29 of Euclid's Elements).

If one pair of consecutive interior angles is supplementary, the other pair is also supplementary.

== Other characteristics of transversals ==
If three lines in general position form a triangle are then cut by a transversal, the lengths of the six resulting segments satisfy Menelaus' theorem.

== Related theorems ==
Euclid's formulation of the parallel postulate may be stated in terms of a transversal. Specifically, if the interior angles on the same side of the transversal are less than two right angles then lines must intersect. In fact, Euclid uses the same phrase in Greek that is usually translated as "transversal".

Euclid's Proposition 27 states that if a transversal intersects two lines so that alternate interior angles are congruent, then the lines are parallel. Euclid proves this by contradiction: If the lines are not parallel then they must intersect and a triangle is formed. Then one of the alternate angles is an exterior angle equal to the other angle which is an opposite interior angle in the triangle. This contradicts Proposition 16 which states that an exterior angle of a triangle is always greater than the opposite interior angles.

Euclid's Proposition 28 extends this result in two ways. First, if a transversal intersects two lines so that corresponding angles are congruent, then the lines are parallel. Second, if a transversal intersects two lines so that interior angles on the same side of the transversal are supplementary, then the lines are parallel. These follow from the previous proposition by applying the fact that opposite angles of intersecting lines are equal (Prop. 15) and that adjacent angles on a line are supplementary (Prop. 13). As noted by Proclus, Euclid gives only three of a possible six such criteria for parallel lines.

Euclid's Proposition 29 is a converse to the previous two. First, if a transversal intersects two parallel lines, then the alternate interior angles are congruent. If not, then one is greater than the other, which implies its supplement is less than the supplement of the other angle. This implies that there are interior angles on the same side of the transversal which are less than two right angles, contradicting the fifth postulate. The proposition continues by stating that on a transversal of two parallel lines, corresponding angles are congruent and the interior angles on the same side are equal to two right angles. These statements follow in the same way that Prop. 28 follows from Prop. 27.

Euclid's proof makes essential use of the fifth postulate, however, modern treatments of geometry use Playfair's axiom instead. To prove proposition 29 assuming Playfair's axiom, let a transversal cross two parallel lines and suppose that the alternate interior angles are not equal. Draw a third line through the point where the transversal crosses the first line, but with an angle equal to the angle the transversal makes with the second line. This produces two different lines through a point, both parallel to another line, contradicting the axiom.

== In higher dimensions ==
In higher dimensional spaces, a line that intersects each of a set of lines in distinct points is a transversal of that set of lines. Unlike the two-dimensional (plane) case, transversals are not guaranteed to exist for sets of more than two lines.

In Euclidean 3-space, a regulus is a set of skew lines, R, such that through each point on each line of R, there passes a transversal of R and through each point of a transversal of R there passes a line of R. The set of transversals of a regulus R is also a regulus, called the opposite regulus, R^{o}. In this space, three mutually skew lines can always be extended to a regulus.
