= Stewart's theorem =

Geometric relation between a triangle's side lengths and cevian length

In geometry, Stewart's theorem yields a relation between the lengths of the sides and the length of a cevian in a triangle. Its name is in honour of the Scottish mathematician Matthew Stewart, who published the theorem in 1746.

== Statement ==
Diagram of Stewart's theorem

Let a, b, c be the lengths of the sides of a triangle. Let d be the length of a cevian to the side of length a. If the cevian divides the side of length a into two segments of length m and n, with m adjacent to c and n adjacent to b, then Stewart's theorem states that
$$b^2m + c^2n = a(d^2 + mn).$$

A common mnemonic used by students to memorize this equation (after rearranging the terms) is:
$$\underset{\text{A }man\text{ and his }dad}{man\ +\ dad} = \!\!\!\!\!\! \underset{\text{put a }bomb\text{ in the }sink.}{bmb\ +\  cnc}$$

The theorem may be written more symmetrically using signed lengths of segments. That is, take the length A̅B̅ to be positive or negative according to whether A is to the left or right of B in some fixed orientation of the line. In this formulation, the theorem states that if A, B, C are collinear points, and P is any point, then

$\left(\overline{PA}^2\cdot \overline{BC}\right) + \left(\overline{PB}^2\cdot \overline{CA}\right) + \left(\overline{PC}^2\cdot \overline{AB}\right) + \left(\overline{AB}\cdot \overline{BC}\cdot \overline{CA}\right) =0.$

In the special case where the cevian is a median (meaning it divides the opposite side into two segments of equal length), the result is known as Apollonius' theorem.

== Proof ==
The theorem can be proved as an application of the law of cosines.

Let θ be the angle between m and d and θ' the angle between n and d. Then θ' is the supplement of θ, and so cos θ' = −cos θ. Applying the law of cosines in the two small triangles using angles θ and θ' produces
$$\begin{align}
c^2 &= m^2 + d^2 - 2dm\cos\theta, \\
b^2  &= n^2 + d^2 - 2dn\cos\theta' \\
&= n^2 + d^2 + 2dn\cos\theta.
\end{align}$$

Multiplying the first equation by n and the third equation by m and adding them eliminates cos θ. One obtains
$$\begin{align}
b^2m + c^2n &= nm^2 + n^2m + (m+n)d^2 \\
&= (m+n)(mn + d^2) \\
&= a(mn + d^2), \\
\end{align}$$
which is the required equation.

Alternatively, the theorem can be proved by drawing a perpendicular from the vertex of the triangle to the base and using the Pythagorean theorem to write the distances b, c, d in terms of the altitude. The left and right hand sides of the equation then reduce algebraically to the same expression.

== History ==
According to Hutton & Gregory (1843, p. 220), Stewart published the result in 1746 when he was a candidate to replace Colin Maclaurin as Professor of Mathematics at the University of Edinburgh. Coxeter & Greitzer (1967, p. 6) state that the result was probably known to Archimedes around 300 B.C.E. They go on to say (mistakenly) that the first known proof was provided by R. Simson in 1751. Hutton & Gregory (1843) state that the result is used by Simson in 1748 and by Simpson in 1752, and its first appearance in Europe given by Lazare Carnot in 1803.

== See also ==
- Mass point geometry
