= Routh's theorem =

Theorem in geometry

Routh's theorem

In geometry, Routh's theorem determines the ratio of areas between a given triangle and a triangle formed by the pairwise intersections of three cevians. The theorem states that if in triangle $ABC$ points $D$, $E$, and $F$ lie on segments $BC$, $CA$, and $AB$, then writing $\tfrac{CD}{BD} = x$, $\tfrac{AE}{CE} = y$, and $\tfrac{BF}{AF} = z$, the signed area of the triangle formed by the cevians $AD$, $BE$, and $CF$ is

$$S_{ABC} \cdot \frac{(xyz - 1)^2}{(xy + y + 1)(yz + z + 1)(zx + x + 1)},$$

where $S_{ABC}$ is the area of the triangle $ABC$.

This theorem was given by Edward John Routh on page 82 of his Treatise on Analytical Statics with Numerous Examples in 1896. The particular case $x = y = z = 2$ has become popularized as the one-seventh area triangle. The $x = y = z = 1$ case implies that the three medians are concurrent (through the centroid).

== Proof ==
Routh's theorem

Suppose that the area of triangle $ABC$ is 1. For triangle $ABD$ and line $FRC$, Menelaus's theorem implies

$$\frac{AF}{FB} \times \frac{BC}{CD} \times \frac{DR}{RA} = -1$$.

Then $\frac{DR}{RA} = \frac{BF}{FA} \times \frac{CD}{CB} = \frac{zx}{x+1}$. Thus the area of triangle $ARC$ is

$$S_{ARC} = \frac{AR}{AD} S_{ADC} = \frac{AR}{AD} \times \frac{DC}{BC} S_{ABC} = \frac{x}{zx+x+1}$$

By similar arguments, $S_{BPA} = \frac{y}{xy+y+1}$ and $S_{CQB} = \frac{z}{yz+z+1}$. Therefore the area of triangle $PQR$ is

$$\begin{align}
S_{PQR} &= S_{ABC} - S_{ARC} - S_{BPA} - S_{CQB} \\
&= 1 - \frac{x}{zx+x+1} - \frac{y}{xy+y+1} - \frac{z}{yz+z+1} \\
&=\frac{(xyz - 1)^2}{(xz + x + 1)(yx + y + 1)(zy + z + 1)}.
\end{align}$$

== Citations ==
The citation commonly given for Routh's theorem is Routh's Treatise on Analytical Statics with Numerous Examples, Volume 1, Chap. IV, in the second edition of 1896 p. 82, possibly because that edition was easier to find. However, Routh stated the theorem already in the first edition of 1891, Volume 1, Chap. IV, p. 89. Although there is a change in pagination between the editions, the wording of the relevant footnote remained the same. Routh concludes his extended footnote with a caveat:

"The author has not met with these expressions for the areas of two triangles that often occur. He has therefore placed them here in order that the argument in the text may be more easily understood."

Presumably, Routh felt those circumstances had not changed in the five years between editions. On the other hand, the title of Routh's book had been used earlier by Isaac Todhunter; both had been coached by William Hopkins.

Although Routh published the theorem in his book, the first known published statement and proof occurred as rider (vii) on page 33 of Solutions of the Cambridge Senate-house Problems and Riders for the Year 1878, i.e., the Cambridge Mathematical Tripos of that year. The author of the problems in that section with roman numerals was James Whitbread Lee Glaisher, who also edited the entire volume. Routh was a well known Tripos coach when his book was published and was surely familiar with the content of the 1878 Tripos examination, though as his statement quoted above suggests, he had perhaps forgotten the source of the theorem in the intervening thirteen years.

Problems in this spirit have a long history in recreational mathematics and mathematical paedagogy, perhaps one of the oldest instances of being the determination of the proportions of the fourteen regions of the Stomachion board. With Routh's Cambridge in mind, the one-seventh-area triangle, associated in some accounts with Richard Feynman, shows up, for example, as Question 100, p. 80, in Euclid's Elements of Geometry (Fifth School Edition), by Robert Potts (1805--1885,) of Trinity College, published in 1859; compare also his Questions 98, 99, on the same page. Potts stood twenty-sixth Wrangler in 1832 and then, like Hopkins and Routh, coached at Cambridge. Pott's expository writings in geometry were recognized by a medal at the International Exhibition of 1862, as well as by an Hon. LL.D. from the College of William and Mary, Williamsburg, Virginia.
