= Splitter (geometry) =

Line segment through a triangle vertex that bisects its perimeter

Arbitrary triangle △ABC Excircles, tangent to the sides of △ABC at T_{A}, T_{B}, T_{C} Extouch triangle △T_{A}T_{B}T_{C} Splitters of the perimeter A̅T̅_{A}, B̅T̅_{B}, C̅T̅_{C}; intersect at the Nagel point N

In Euclidean geometry, a splitter is a line segment through one of the vertices of a triangle (that is, a cevian) that bisects the perimeter of the triangle. They are not to be confused with cleavers, which also bisect the perimeter but instead emanate from the midpoint of one of the triangle's sides.

== Properties ==
The opposite endpoint of a splitter to the chosen triangle vertex lies at the point on the triangle's side where one of the excircles of the triangle is tangent to that side. This point is also called a splitting point of the triangle. It is additionally a vertex of the extouch triangle and one of the points where the Mandart inellipse is tangent to the triangle side.

The three splitters concur at the Nagel point of the triangle, which is also called its splitting center.

== Generalization ==
Some authors have used the term "splitter" in a more general sense, for any line segment that bisects the perimeter of the triangle. Other line segments of this type include the cleavers, which are perimeter-bisecting segments that pass through the midpoint of a triangle side, and the equalizers, segments that bisect both the area and perimeter of a triangle.
