= Menelaus's theorem =

Geometric relation on line segments formed by a line cutting through a triangle

Menelaus's theorem, case 1: line DEF passes inside triangle △ABC

In Euclidean geometry, Menelaus's theorem, named for Menelaus of Alexandria, is a proposition about triangles in plane geometry. Suppose we have a triangle △ABC, and a transversal line that crosses BC, AC, AB at points D, E, F respectively, with D, E, F distinct from A, B, C. A weak version of the theorem states that

$$\left|\frac{\overline{AF}}{\overline{FB}}\right| \times \left|\frac{\overline{BD}}{\overline{DC}}\right| \times \left|\frac{\overline{CE}}{\overline{EA}}\right| = 1,$$

where "| |" denotes absolute value (i.e., all segment lengths are positive).

The theorem can be strengthened to a statement about signed lengths of segments, which provides some additional information about the relative order of collinear points. Here, the length A̅B̅ is taken to be positive or negative according to whether A is to the left or right of B in some fixed orientation of the line; for example, $\tfrac{\overline{AF}}{\overline{FB}}$ is defined as having positive value when F is between A and B and negative otherwise. The signed version of Menelaus's theorem states

$$\frac{\overline{AF}}{\overline{FB}} \times \frac{\overline{BD}}{\overline{DC}} \times \frac{\overline{CE}}{\overline{EA}} = - 1.$$

Equivalently,

$$\overline{AF} \times \overline{BD} \times \overline{CE} = - \overline{FB} \times \overline{DC} \times \overline{EA}.$$

Some authors organize the factors differently and obtain the seemingly different relation
$$\frac{\overline{FA}}{\overline{FB}} \times \frac{\overline{DB}}{\overline{DC}} \times \frac{\overline{EC}}{\overline{EA}} = 1,$$
but as each of these factors is the negative of the corresponding factor above, the relation is seen to be the same.

The converse is also true: If points D, E, F are chosen on BC, AC, AB respectively so that
$$\frac{\overline{AF}}{\overline{FB}} \times \frac{\overline{BD}}{\overline{DC}} \times \frac{\overline{CE}}{\overline{EA}} = -1,$$
then D, E, F are collinear. The converse is often included as part of the theorem. (Note that the converse of the weaker, unsigned statement is not necessarily true.)

The theorem is very similar to Ceva's theorem in that their equations differ only in sign. By re-writing each in terms of cross-ratios, the two theorems may be seen as projective duals.

== Proofs ==
Menelaus's theorem, case 2: line DEF is entirely outside triangle △ABC

=== A standard proof ===
A proof given by John Wellesley Russell uses Pasch's axiom to consider cases where a line does or does not meet a triangle. First, the sign of the left-hand side will be negative since either all three of the ratios are negative, the case where the line DEF misses the triangle (see diagram), or one is negative and the other two are positive, the case where DEF crosses two sides of the triangle.

To check the magnitude, construct perpendiculars from A, B, C to the line DEF and let their lengths be a, b, c respectively. Then by similar triangles it follows that
$$\left|\frac{\overline{AF}}{\overline{FB}}\right| = \left|\frac{a}{b}\right|, \quad \left|\frac{\overline{BD}}{\overline{DC}}\right| = \left|\frac{b}{c}\right|, \quad \left|\frac{\overline{CE}}{\overline{EA}}\right| = \left|\frac{c}{a}\right|.$$

Therefore,
$$\left|\frac{\overline{AF}}{\overline{FB}}\right| \times \left|\frac{\overline{BD}}{\overline{DC}}\right| \times \left|\frac{\overline{CE}}{\overline{EA}}\right| = \left| \frac{a}{b}  \times \frac{b}{c} \times \frac{c}{a} \right| = 1.$$

For a simpler, if less symmetrical way to check the magnitude, draw C̅K̅ parallel to A̅B̅ where DEF meets C̅K̅ at K. Then by similar triangles
$$\left|\frac{\overline{BD}}{\overline{DC}}\right| = \left|\frac{\overline{BF}}{\overline{CK}}\right|, \quad \left|\frac{\overline{AE}}{\overline{EC}}\right| = \left|\frac{\overline{AF}}{\overline{CK}}\right|,$$
and the result follows by eliminating C̅K̅ from these equations.

The converse follows as a corollary. Let D, E, F be given on the lines BC, AC, AB so that the equation holds. Let F' be the point where DE crosses AB. Then by the theorem, the equation also holds for D, E, F'. Comparing the two,
$$\frac{\overline{AF}}{\overline{FB}} = \frac{\overline{AF'}}{\overline{F'B}}\ .$$
But at most one point can cut a segment in a given ratio so F = F'.

=== A proof using homotheties ===
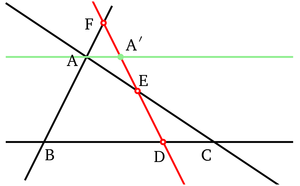
Homothetie centers D, E F are colinear iff the composition is identity.

The following proof uses only notions of affine geometry, notably homotheties. Whether or not D, E, F are collinear, there are three homotheties with centers D, E, F that respectively send B to C, C to A, and A to B. The composition of the three then is an element of the group of homothety-translations that fixes B, so it is a homothety with center B, possibly with ratio 1 (in which case it is the identity). This composition fixes the line DE if and only if F is collinear with D, E (since the first two homotheties certainly fix DE, and the third does so only if F lies on DE). Therefore D, E, F are collinear if and only if this composition is the identity, which means that the magnitude of the product of the three ratios is 1:
$$\frac{\overrightarrow{DC}}{\overrightarrow{DB}}  \times
\frac{\overrightarrow{EA}}{\overrightarrow{EC}} \times
\frac{\overrightarrow{FB}}{\overrightarrow{FA}} = 1,$$
which is equivalent to the given equation.

== History ==
It is uncertain who actually discovered the theorem; however, the oldest extant exposition appears in Spherics by Menelaus. In this book, the plane version of the theorem is used as a lemma to prove a spherical version of the theorem.

In Almagest, Ptolemy applies the theorem on a number of problems in spherical astronomy. During the Islamic Golden Age, Muslim scholars devoted a number of works that engaged in the study of Menelaus's theorem, which they referred to as "the proposition on the secants" (shakl al-qatta'). The complete quadrilateral was called the "figure of secants" in their terminology. Al-Biruni's work, The Keys of Astronomy, lists a number of those works, which can be classified into studies as part of commentaries on Ptolemy's Almagest as in the works of al-Nayrizi and al-Khazin where each demonstrated particular cases of Menelaus's theorem that led to the sine rule, or works composed as independent treatises such as:

- The "Treatise on the Figure of Secants" (Risala fi shakl al-qatta') by Thabit ibn Qurra.
- Husam al-Din al-Salar's Removing the Veil from the Mysteries of the Figure of Secants (Kashf al-qina' 'an asrar al-shakl al-qatta'), also known as "The Book on the Figure of Secants" (Kitab al-shakl al-qatta') or in Europe as The Treatise on the Complete Quadrilateral. The lost treatise was referred to by Sharaf al-Din al-Tusi and Nasir al-Din al-Tusi.
- Work by al-Sijzi.
- Tahdhib by Abu Nasr ibn Iraq.
- Roshdi Rashed and Athanase Papadopoulos, Menelaus' Spherics: Early Translation and al-Mahani'/al-Harawi's version (Critical edition of Menelaus' Spherics from the Arabic manuscripts, with historical and mathematical commentaries), De Gruyter, Series: Scientia Graeco-Arabica, 21, 2017, 890 pages. ISBN 978-3-11-057142-4

In the West the theorem was rediscovered by the Italian mathematician Giovanni Ceva.
