= Nagel point =

Triangle center; intersection of all three of a triangle's splitters

Arbitrary triangle △ABC Excircles, tangent to the sides of △ABC at T_{A}, T_{B}, T_{C} Extouch triangle △T_{A}T_{B}T_{C} Splitters of the perimeter A̅T̅_{A}, B̅T̅_{B}, C̅T̅_{C}; intersect at the Nagel point N

In geometry, the Nagel point (named for Christian Heinrich von Nagel) is a triangle center, one of the points associated with a given triangle whose definition does not depend on the placement or scale of the triangle. It is the point of concurrency of all three of the triangle's splitters.

== Construction ==
Given a triangle △ABC, let T_{A}, T_{B}, T_{C} be the extouch points in which the A-excircle meets line BC, the B-excircle meets line CA, and the C-excircle meets line AB, respectively. The lines AT_{A}, BT_{B}, CT_{C} concur in the Nagel point N of triangle △ABC.

Another construction of the point T_{A} is to start at A and trace around triangle △ABC half its perimeter, and similarly for T_{B} and T_{C}. Because of this construction, the Nagel point is sometimes also called the bisected perimeter point, and the segments A̅T̅_{A}, B̅T̅_{B}, C̅T̅_{C} are called the triangle's splitters.

There exists an easy construction of the Nagel point. Starting from each vertex of a triangle, it suffices to carry twice the length of the opposite edge. We obtain three lines which concur at the Nagel point.

Easy construction of the Nagel point

== Relation to other triangle centers ==
The Nagel point is the isotomic conjugate of the Gergonne point. The Nagel point, the centroid, and the incenter are collinear on a line called the Nagel line. The incenter is the Nagel point of the medial triangle; equivalently, the Nagel point is the incenter of the anticomplementary triangle. The isogonal conjugate of the Nagel point is the point of concurrency of the lines joining the mixtilinear touchpoint and the opposite vertex.

== Barycentric coordinates ==
The un-normalized barycentric coordinates of the Nagel point are $(s-a:s-b:s-c)$ where $s = \tfrac{a+b+c}{2}$ is the semi-perimeter of the reference triangle △ABC.

== Trilinear coordinates ==
The trilinear coordinates of the Nagel point are as

$$\csc^2\left(\frac{A}{2}\right)\,:\,\csc^2\left(\frac{B}{2}\right)\,:\,\csc^2\left(\frac{C}{2}\right)$$

or, equivalently, in terms of the side lengths $a=\left|\overline{BC}\right|, b=\left|\overline{CA}\right|, c=\left|\overline{AB}\right|,$

$$\frac{b + c - a}{a}\,:\,\frac{c + a - b}{b}\,:\,\frac{a + b - c}{c}.$$

== History ==
The Nagel point is named after Christian Heinrich von Nagel, a nineteenth-century German mathematician, who wrote about it in 1836. Early contributions to the study of this point were also made by August Leopold Crelle and Carl Gustav Jacob Jacobi.

== See also ==
- Mandart inellipse
- Trisected perimeter point
