= Musselman =

Musselman may refer to:

== People ==
- Andrew J. Musselman Jr. (1926–1997), American politician
- Bill Musselman (1940–2000), American basketball coach
- Eric Musselman (born 1964), American basketball coach
- Jeff Musselman (born 1963), American baseball player
- John Rogers Musselman (1890–1968), American mathematician
  - Musselman's theorem, in geometry
- M. M. Musselman (1899-1952), a Hollywood screenwriter and author
- Maddie Musselman (born 1998), American water polo player
- Mary Mussleman Whitmer (1778–1856), American Book of Mormon witness
- Ron Musselman (born 1954), American baseball player

== Places ==
- Musselman, Ohio, U.S.
- Musselman Lake, Ontario, Canada
- Cape Musselman, Antarctica

== Other uses ==
- Musselman High School, Berkeley County, West Virginia, U.S.

== See also ==
- Muslim (disambiguation)
- Muscleman, any man with well-developed muscles
- Muselmann, a term for Nazi concentration camp prisoners suffering from extreme stages of starvation
- Musalman (disambiguation)
