= December 1966 =

Month of 1966

<<	December 1966					>>
Su	Mo	Tu	We	Th	Fr	Sa
				1	2	3
4	5	6	7	8	9	10
11	12	13	14	15	16	17
18	19	20	21	22	23	24
25	26	27	28	29	30	31

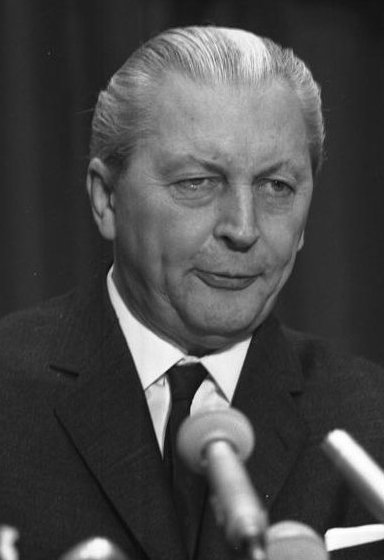
December 1, 1966: Kiesinger elected West German Chancellor

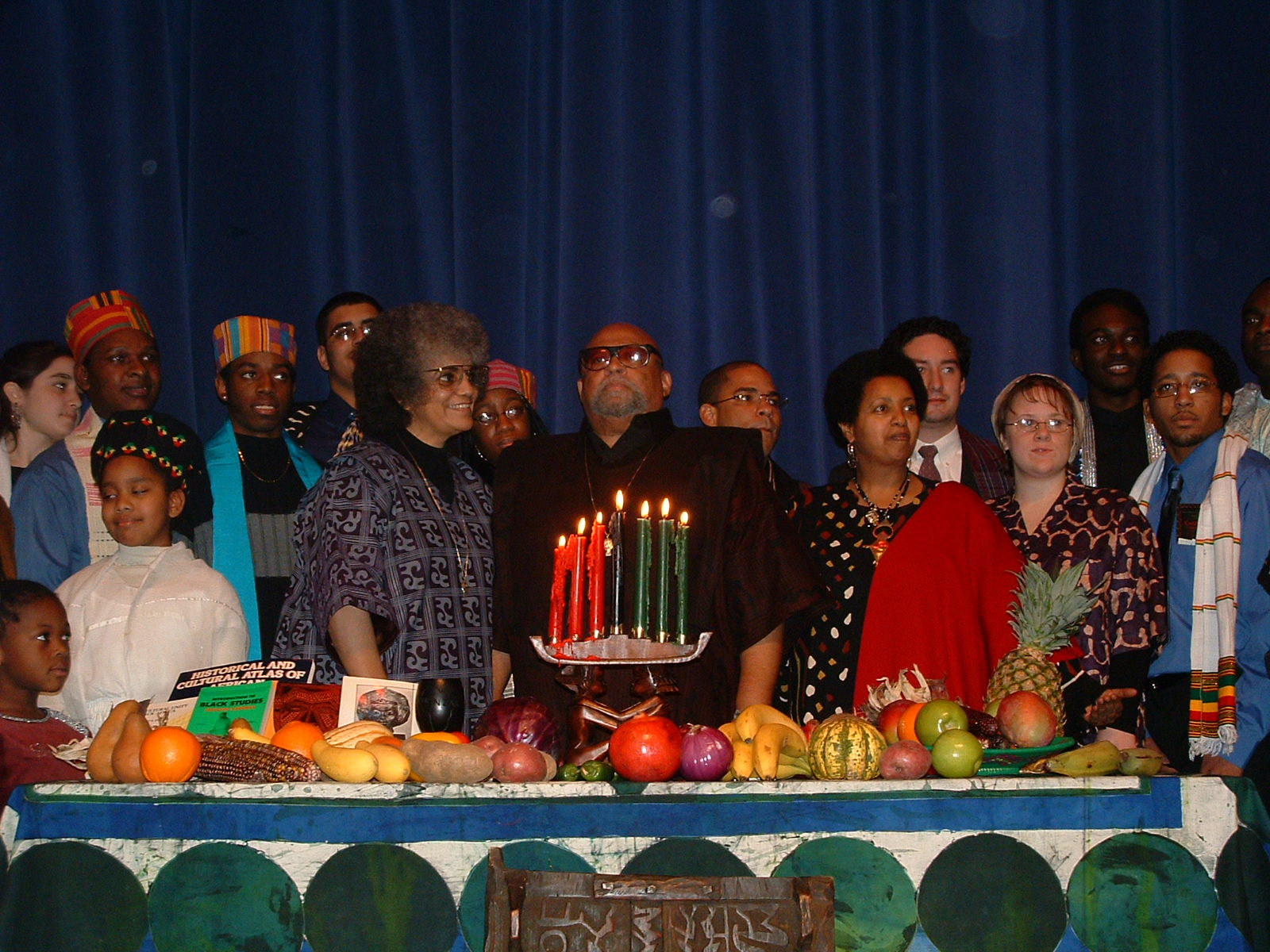
December 26, 1966: Kwanzaa celebration first observed (pictured: Kwanzaa inventor Maulana Karenga)

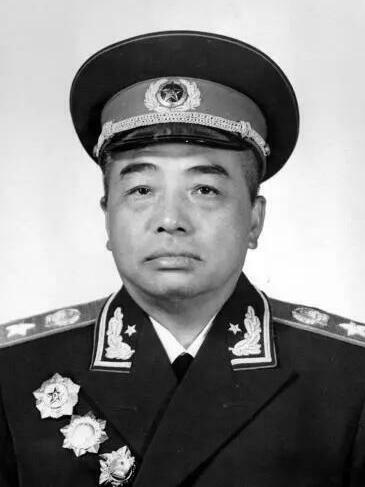
December 25, 1966: Former Chinese Defense Minister Peng Dehuai sentenced to life in prison

The following events occurred in December 1966:

== December 1, 1966 (Thursday) ==
- Kurt Georg Kiesinger was elected Chancellor of West Germany by a 126–53 vote of the Bundestag. The vote to approve Kiesinger and his cabinet came in the early morning hours "after a long and bitter debate".

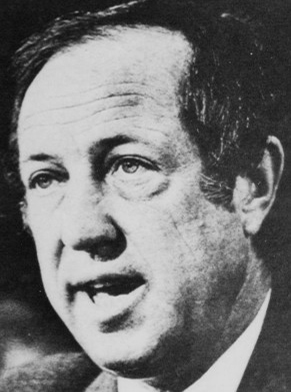
Pete Rozelle

- National Football League Commissioner Pete Rozelle announced the date and location of the first "Super Bowl", telling reporters in New York that the NFL champion would play against the American Football League champion on January 15, 1967, at the Los Angeles Coliseum.
- A NASA study group, chaired by John H. Disher, reported on using various modified Apollo Lunar Modules suitable for lunar exploration as part of the Apollo Applications Program (AAP). Modified modules could serve as a LM "taxi", a ferry and logistics craft, a LM shelter, and an "augmented" LM. Disher recommended an increase of the Saturn V's translunar injection capability to 46,720 kilograms (103,000 lb).
- Born: Larry Walker, Canadian baseball player, National League MVP in 1997; in Maple Ridge, British Columbia
- Died: Carter Stanley, 41, American bluegrass musician and co-founder of The Stanley Brothers, died from cirrhosis. His brother, Ralph Stanley, would outlive him by half a century.

== December 2, 1966 (Friday) ==
- British Prime Minister Harold Wilson and Rhodesian Prime minister Ian Smith met for negotiations on board the British warship HMS Tiger in the Mediterranean. After Smith's return, the Rhodesian government rejected the "Tiger Pact" proposed by the British, who had set a deadline of noon on December 5 for an answer. Among the British demands was a return of control of the armed forces and the police to Sir Humphrey Gibbs, and his restoration as Governor of the colony, as well as a dissolution of the Rhodesian parliament.
- U Thant agreed to serve a second term as U.N. Secretary General. The UN General Assembly then voted, 120–0, to elect the diplomat from Burma to another five-year term, running from January 1, 1967 to December 31, 1971.
- Abdallah El-Yafi resigned as Prime Minister of Lebanon. He would be replaced on December 7 by Rashid Karami.
- Died:
  - L. E. J. Brouwer, 85, Dutch mathematician and philosopher, advocate of the branch of intuitionism
  - Giles Cooper, 48, British radio dramatist was killed when he fell from a moving train after becoming intoxicated. A coroner's inquest listed the cause as "death by misadventure".

== December 3, 1966 (Saturday) ==
- Following a luncheon hosted by the French Diplomatic Press Association in Paris, visiting Soviet Prime Minister Alexei N. Kosygin answered the questions of reporters in a press conference. One reporter asked Kosygin about whether the Soviet Union would allow Soviet Jews to emigrate to Israel, and Kosygin replied that "If there are some families divided by the war who want to meet their relatives outside the USSR or even to leave the USSR, we shall do all in our power to help them. The way is open to them and will remain open and there is no problem." Kosygin's statement was reprinted in Izvestia two days later (albeit without the statement that the government would do all in its power to help), and hundreds of Soviet Jews filed applications to depart. Kosygin's statement would also make the emigration issue part of future negotiations between Western nations and the Soviets.
- János Kádár was unanimously re-elected as the General Secretary of the Magyar Szocialista Munkáspárt (the Hungarian Socialist Workers' Party, Hungary's Communist Party) by the Central Committee, keeping him in power as the de facto leader of Hungary for a third term. The party's Politburo was reduced from 12 seats to 11, with the retirement of former President Ferenc Münnich and Miklos Somogyi, and the elevation of former Finance Minister Rezső Nyers. The day before, Kadar called for a "normalization of relations" with the United States, and told the Central Committee, "I, as a Communist, can add we wish the American people the very best, peace and prosperity and friendship."
- Anti-Portuguese demonstrations that would later be referred to as the "12-3 Incident" or the "123 Incident" because of the date of 12/3/1966 turned into a riot in the Portuguese colony of Macau, located on the mainland of China, and hundreds of people were injured, with eight Chinese protesters killed by Portuguese riot police. "Although the People's Republic of China did not assume formal control of Macau until 1999," a historian would write later, "many observers view the '123 Incident'... as the point at which the Portuguese lost effective sovereignty over the city."
- At 7:15 a.m., the United States carried out Project Sterling, a test to determine whether the sound of an underground nuclear explosion could be muffled. The test, made underground at a depth of 0.5 miles (0.80 km) below the Tatum Salt Dome in Lamar County, Mississippi, made "no audible sound", and no measurable increase in radiation, at the surface.
- Television pop group The Monkees made their live concert debut at the Honolulu International Center Arena.

== December 4, 1966 (Sunday) ==
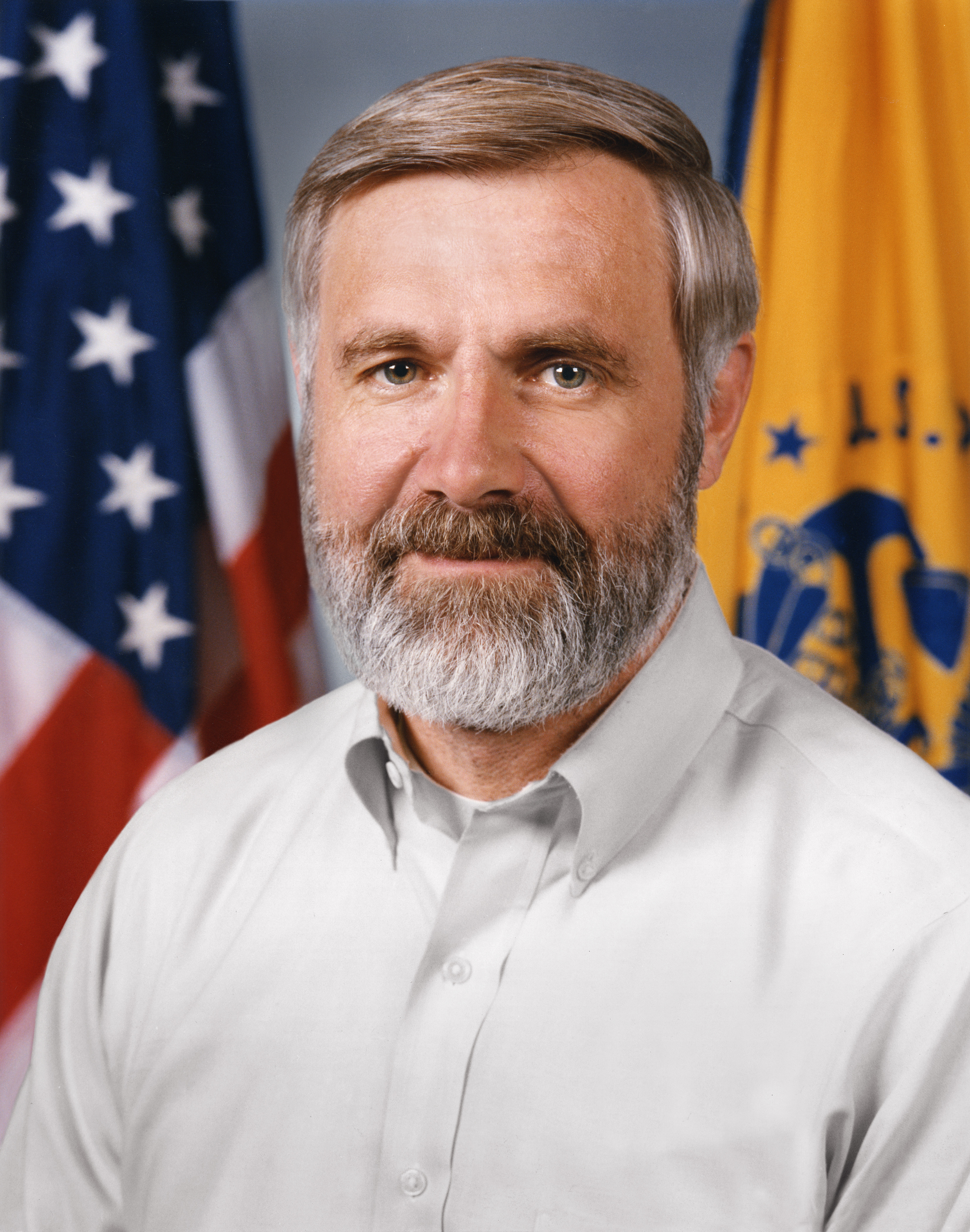
Dr. Foege

- Working in the Ogoja Province in eastern Nigeria, Dr. William Foege first implemented the "surveillance and containment" strategy that would eventually eliminate smallpox throughout the world. An American epidemiologist as well as being a Lutheran missionary, Foege acted with the knowledge that smallpox was contagious for only two weeks, slow moving in its progress and, most importantly, that "infected people rarely transmitted the disease to more than a few others, mostly within the immediate household". Consulting with 14 other missionaries in the region, Foege arranged for a communications network in villages and marketplaces, looking for signs of a smallpox infection and, "When an infected person was found, a map of his or her likely social pathways was drawn, and everyone on it immunized". This course of action "demonstrated that smallpox could be treated and eliminated from large areas by immunizing as few as six percent of the people— if they were the right people at the right time!"

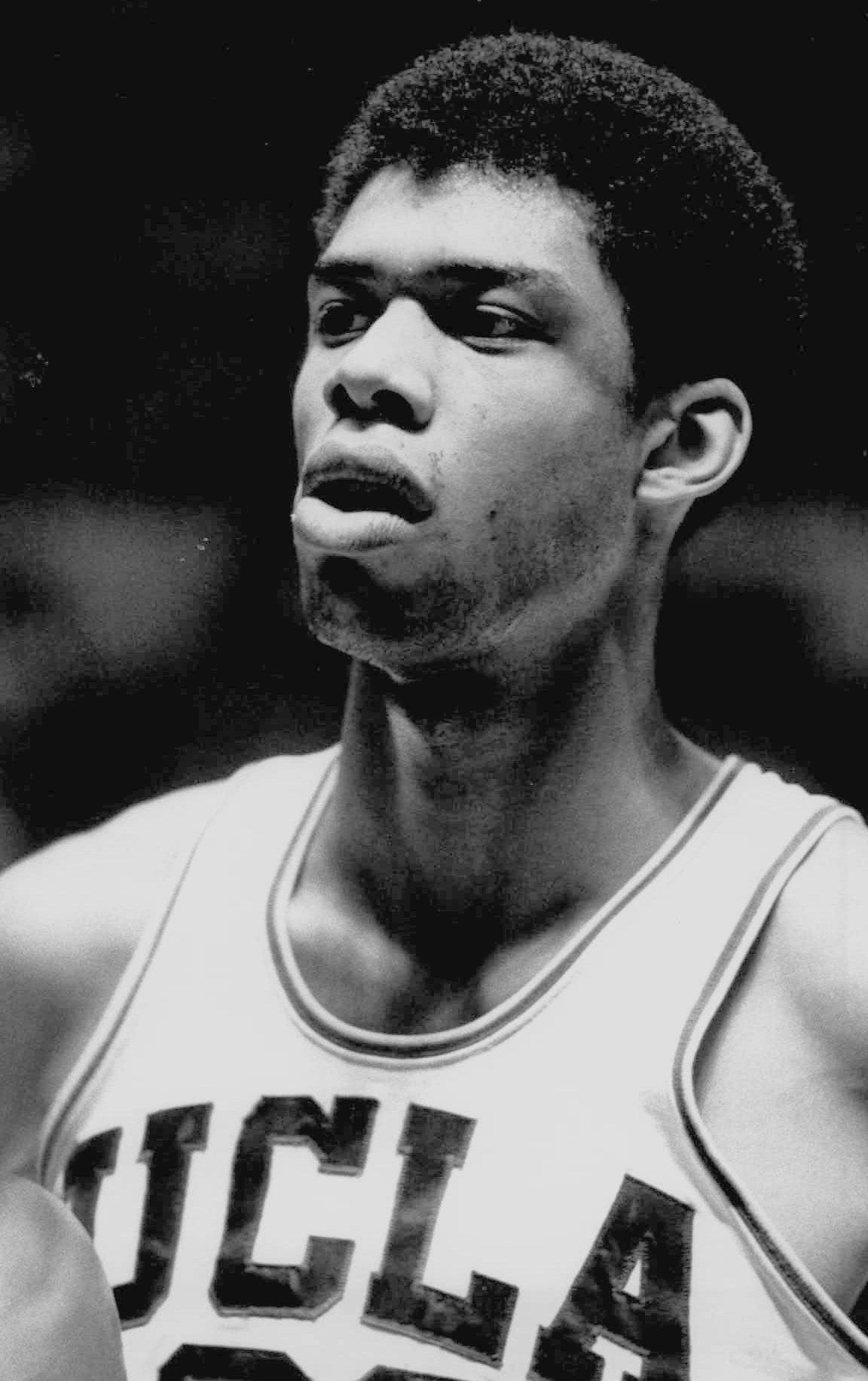
Lew Alcindor

- Lew Alcindor (later Kareem Abdul-Jabbar) made his college basketball debut. In his very first game for UCLA, he broke the school record for most points scored in a game, pouring in 56 points in a 105–90 win over USC. His points came on 23 field goals and 10 free throws; the previous record, 42 points, had been set by Gail Goodrich in 1965.
- The 1966 LPGA Tour ended with Kathy Whitworth having won the most tournaments (nine), making her Player of the Year. The following month, she would be voted the female athlete of the year in a poll of 428 sportswriters and broadcasters.
- Born: Fred Armisen (Fereydun Armisen), American comedian; in Hattiesburg, Mississippi
- Died: Nicholas Afanasiev, 73, Russian Orthodox priest and theologian

== December 5, 1966 (Monday) ==
- In a case frequently cited as an example of the phenomenon of spontaneous human combustion, John Irving Bentley, a 92-year-old retired physician and surgeon, was found dead in his home in Coudersport, Pennsylvania. An Associated Press report noted only that he was "found dead in his Potter County home Monday, apparently the victim of a fire" and that "His clothes and the floor were partially burned." The facts were more gruesome, because a meter reader found only a pile of ashes. The only identifiable portions of Bentley were "his lower right leg, still clad in its bedroom slipper, and his walker, which strangely enough suffered little damage", as seen in a famous photograph of the death scene. Some authors have blamed spontaneous combustion. Others point out that the leg was "lying at the edge of a hole about two and a half by four feet that had burned into the basement" and that Bentley was a pipe smoker who had previously been burned from dropping matches, or hot ashes, onto his clothes. A plausible theory was that Bentley had accidentally ignited his robe, attempted to douse the flames with water from a pitcher, and ignited the linoleum floor, the hardwood flooring and wooden beams beneath it.
- The United States Supreme Court ruled unanimously that African-American candidate Julian Bond had been improperly denied a seat in the Georgia House of Representatives after winning two elections to the state legislature. The Court concluded that the basis for the disqualification (Bond's criticism of American policies in the Vietnam War) had been a violation of Bond's right to free speech. "Legislators have an obligation to take positions on controversial political questions," Chief Justice Earl Warren wrote, "so that their constituents can be fully informed by them," and added that the denial of the seat "violated Bond's right of free expression under the First Amendment". The House would, reluctantly, administer the oath of office to Representative Bond, along with all the other members, on January 9, 1967.
- NASA Headquarters introduced the "cluster concept" in its plans for the Apollo Applications Program, with a schedule for launching the Orbital Workshop after launching a crew in an Apollo command and service module, to take place as early as June 1968, and the two units would be docked in orbit. Six months later, a Lunar Module and Apollo Telescope Mount (LM/ATM) would be launched soon after a second crewed flight, and the LM/ATM would be added as a third and fourth component of the orbiting cluster. The schedule called for 22 Saturn IB and 15 Saturn V launches.
- The successful musical I Do! I Do! opened on Broadway, at the 46th Street Theatre, and would run for 560 performances. The entire cast was limited to two actors, and only one set, as the play followed the course of a 50-year marriage. Mary Martin and Robert Preston were the first to perform the roles of Agnes and Michael Snow.
- Buffalo Springfield recorded their most famous single "For What It's Worth". The song was based on the curfew riots that took place on November 12.
- Born: Patricia Kaas, French singer and actress; in Forbach, Lorraine

== December 6, 1966 (Tuesday) ==
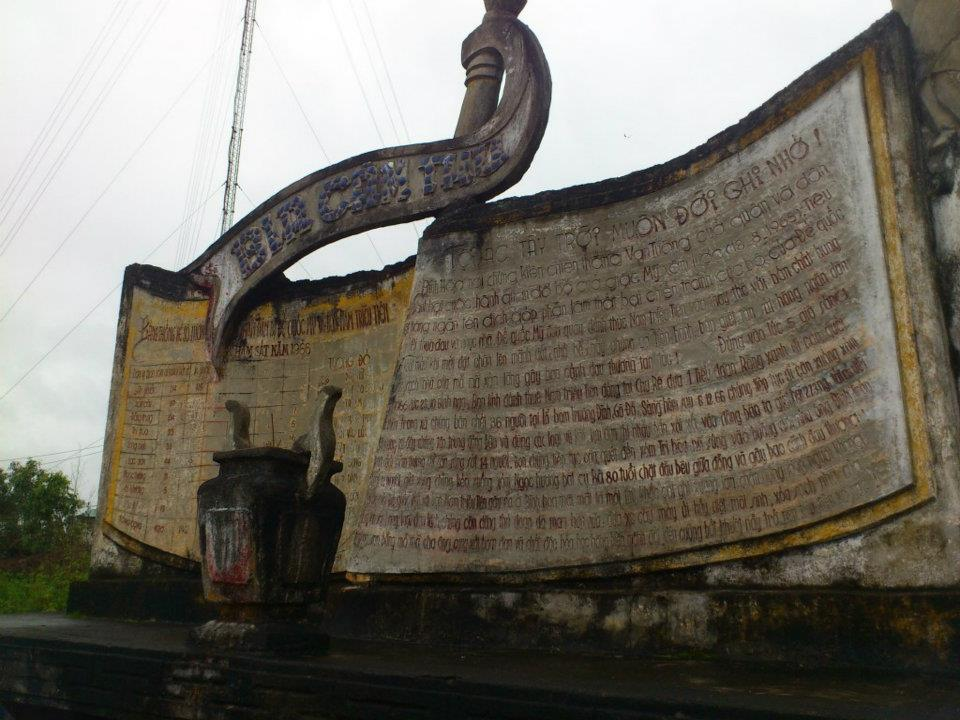
The Bien Hoa Memorial to 456 civilians

- The Bình Hòa massacre was purportedly carried out over the course of two days, as South Korean troops reportedly killed 456 men, women and children in two villages in the Quảng Ngãi Province of South Vietnam. On December 5, the village of Bình Hòa was surrounded at dawn by soldiers, and the inhabitants killed. The next day, troops moved to the nearby village of An Phuoc, 4 miles (6.4 km) away, and murdered its inhabitants. According to a 2000 Associated Press story, however, a commemorative monument in Bình Hòa says that the massacres took place from October 22 to October 26, 1966. The event was first reported in the late 1980s.
- Proclaiming that he was "mad at Congress", a 27-year-old man from Paterson, New Jersey, used a large pair of shears to vandalize four paintings in the United States Capitol, until being stopped by Capitol police. Damaged extensively were Scene at the Signing of the Constitution of the United States, by Howard Chandler Christy, and the portraits of Henry Clay by John Neagle; of Charles Carroll of Carrollton by Chester Harding; and of Gunning Bedford Jr. by Charles Willson Peale.
- The West German Air Force grounded its fleet of 635 Lockheed F-104 Starfighters to investigate continuing accidents with that aircraft. Over a period of five years, 65 of the original 700 supersonic jets had crashed, and 37 pilots had been killed. The grounding, the third one since West Germany had purchased the planes from the U.S., came a week after the latest fatal accident.

== December 7, 1966 (Wednesday) ==
- The United States launched ATS-1 (Applications Technology Satellite), the first experimental equatorial synchronous satellite, into geostationary orbit at 23,000 mi (37,000 km) above the equator. Carrying the Spin Scan Cloud Camera, developed by Verner E. Suomi and Robert Parent at the University of Wisconsin, ATS-1 could take full photos of the Western Hemisphere every 30 minutes, and transmit them back to Earth. "For the first time," historians would note later, "rapid-imaging of nearly an entire hemisphere was possible. We could watch, fascinated, as storm systems developed and moved and were captured in a time series of images. Today such images are an indispensable part of weather analysis and forecasting."
- Trần Văn Văn, considered a leading candidate for President of South Vietnam, was assassinated in Saigon after leaving the office of Prime Minister Nguyen Cao Ky. Tran, a 58-year-old politician who had formerly been the Secretary General of the nation's High National Council, had recently been elected to the 117-member assembly that was to draw up a new constitution. He was riding in a car when a motorcycle pulled alongside and killed him with four bullets. Vo Van Enh, a 20-year-old member of the Viet Cong, admitted that he had killed Tran on orders from the North Vietnamese guerrilla group.
- David James, a 28-year-old graduate student in chemistry at the California Institute of Technology (Caltech) in Pasadena, demonstrated his discovery of a solution made by combining one part polyethylene oxide to 199 parts of water that could cause water to flow upward, in what he described as a "tubeless siphon".
- Born: C. Thomas Howell, American film and TV actor; in Van Nuys, California

== December 8, 1966 (Thursday) ==
- The Greek passenger and car ferry SS Heraklion, with 262 people on board, began sinking during a gale while attempting to cross in the Aegean Sea. The Typaldos Line ship was halfway between the island of Crete and the mainland port of Piraeus when the radio operator sent the emergency call at 2:00 in the morning, and was gone within an hour. Ultimately, 45 survivors were rescued, while the other 217 went down with the ship. Interviews with the survivors determined that the disaster had been caused by a 16-ton refrigerator truck that had been insufficiently secured inside the ferry. As the ship rocked violently in the 70-mile-per-hour (110 km/h) winds, cars and trucks broke from their fastenings and battered the loading doors. When the tractor-trailer "became a monstrous battering ram", it tore open a door on the front of the ship, and water rushed in, sinking the Heraklion in only 15 minutes.
- The U.S. and the USSR signed a treaty prohibiting nuclear weapons in space.
- Born:
  - Bushwick Bill (stage name for Richard Shaw), Jamaican-born American rapper; in Kingston (d. 2019)
  - Sinéad O'Connor, Irish singer; in Glenageary, County Dublin (d. 2023)
- Died: Arthur B. Coble, 86, American mathematician with specialty in algebraic geometry, for whom the Coble hypersurface and three other concepts (the Coble curve, Coble surface and Coble variety) are named.

== December 9, 1966 (Friday) ==
- American troops in the Vietnam War encountered a new type of weapon that disabled two helicopters that day, and a third the next day, by an explosive mine that could be set off by the air currents generated by a hovering aircraft. The trap, according to reports, "at first glance appears to be nothing more than a thin stick standing up in the tall elephant grass... The backwash of an approaching helicopter knocks the stick over which in turn detonates an aimed mine-type explosive powerful enough to blow a helicopter apart."
- The "Cincinnati Strangler" killed his seventh, and final victim. Police in Cincinnati, Ohio, arrested Posteal Laskey Jr., a 29-year taxi cab driver, four hours later, and although he would only be charged with one of the murders that had been committed over the period of a year, Laskey would be given a life sentence for the stabbing murder of another woman, and there would be no similar killings.
- In Tombstone, Arizona, where Town Marshal Virgil Earp once confronted the Clanton gang in the 1881 "Gunfight at the O.K. Corral", Democrat Joe Perotti and Republican Everett Brownley met to determine who would be the Town Marshal for 1967. Both had received exactly 181 votes in the November election, and agreed to settle the matter with a coin toss, which Brownley won.
- Fresh Cream, the debut album by Cream, was released in the United Kingdom.
- The 1966 Asian Games opened in Bangkok, Thailand.
- Born:
  - Kirsten Gillibrand, U.S. Senator for New York since 2009, U.S. House of Representatives (2007–2009); in Albany, New York
  - Julio Rodas, soccer football striker, with 51 appearances for the Guatemala national team; in Guatemala
  - Mateo Romero, Native American artist; in Berkeley, California
  - Toby Huss, American actor; in Marshalltown, Iowa
- Died:
  - Morris Fidanque de Castro, 64, the first native of the U.S. Virgin Islands to serve as its Governor
  - Lazarus Aaronson, 71, British poet who converted from Orthodox Judaism to Christianity
  - Paul G. Blazer, 76, American entrepreneur and founder of the Ashland Oil Company
  - Pelagie Doane, 60, American book illustrator
  - Harry F. Ward, 93, first national chairman of the American Civil Liberties Union.

== December 10, 1966 (Saturday) ==
- At Parkland Memorial Hospital in Dallas, Jay Sanford told the press that Jack Ruby had been diagnosed with terminal cancer. Ruby, who was weeks away from a new trial for the murder of Lee Harvey Oswald, had killed the accused presidential assassin in front of the largest number of witnesses in history, as millions of viewers watched on live national television on November 24, 1963. Two days earlier, Ruby had been taken from his jail cell and admitted to the hospital for treatment of pneumonia, and the lymph-node biopsy had been performed the next day.
- A cameraman for the Australian Broadcasting Company filmed his own fatal accident when the helicopter he was riding in went out of control and crashed through the roof of the Paul Building in Sydney. The Department of Civil Aviation reported that Frank Parnell, who was filming an ABC documentary about the Sydney Opera House, "kept his camera working as a wildly spinning helicopter carried him to his death". Killed also were Assistant Producer Patricia Ludford and the charter pilot James Riley.
- In the worst episode of friendly fire up to that time in the Vietnam War, 16 U.S. Marines were killed and 11 others injured when an American bomber dropped two 250-pound (110 kg) bombs on them. The U.S. Fourth Marine Battalion was fighting in the Quảng Trị Province, near Đông Hà, when it came under a mortar attack, and was firing its own 81 mm shells when the bombs "either bounced off a ridge of boulders, or fell about 300 yards from their intended target."
- Soviet radar calibration target satellite Kosmos 123 decayed from orbit around the Earth.

== December 11, 1966 (Sunday) ==
- Giuseppe Saragat, the President of Italy, issued presidential pardons to nine inmates of the Maria Teresa Prison in Florence, in recognition of their heroism during the flood of the Arno River on November 4. As the waters rose, the men swam to the prison's workshop, obtained ladders and acetylene torches, then rescued the families of four prison employees who lived on the prison grounds. Eleven children and nine adults were saved by the action of the prisoners, who returned to incarceration after the 12-foot (3.7 m) high waters receded.
- NASA released the first photograph to show "almost the entire disc of the Earth", taken two days earlier from the ATS-1 satellite from a height of 23,000 miles (37,000 km). Areas not obscured by cloud cover and identifiable in the photo were the southern portion of North America (with much of the United States), much of Central America, and a section of the coast of Chile in South America.
- The Tbilisi Metro opened in Tbilisi, Georgian SSR. It was the fourth underground subway train system to be established in the Soviet Union.
- Born:
  - Leon Lai, Hong Kong singer of Cantonese popular music (Cantopop); in Beijing
  - Gary Dourdan, American television actor; in Philadelphia

== December 12, 1966 (Monday) ==
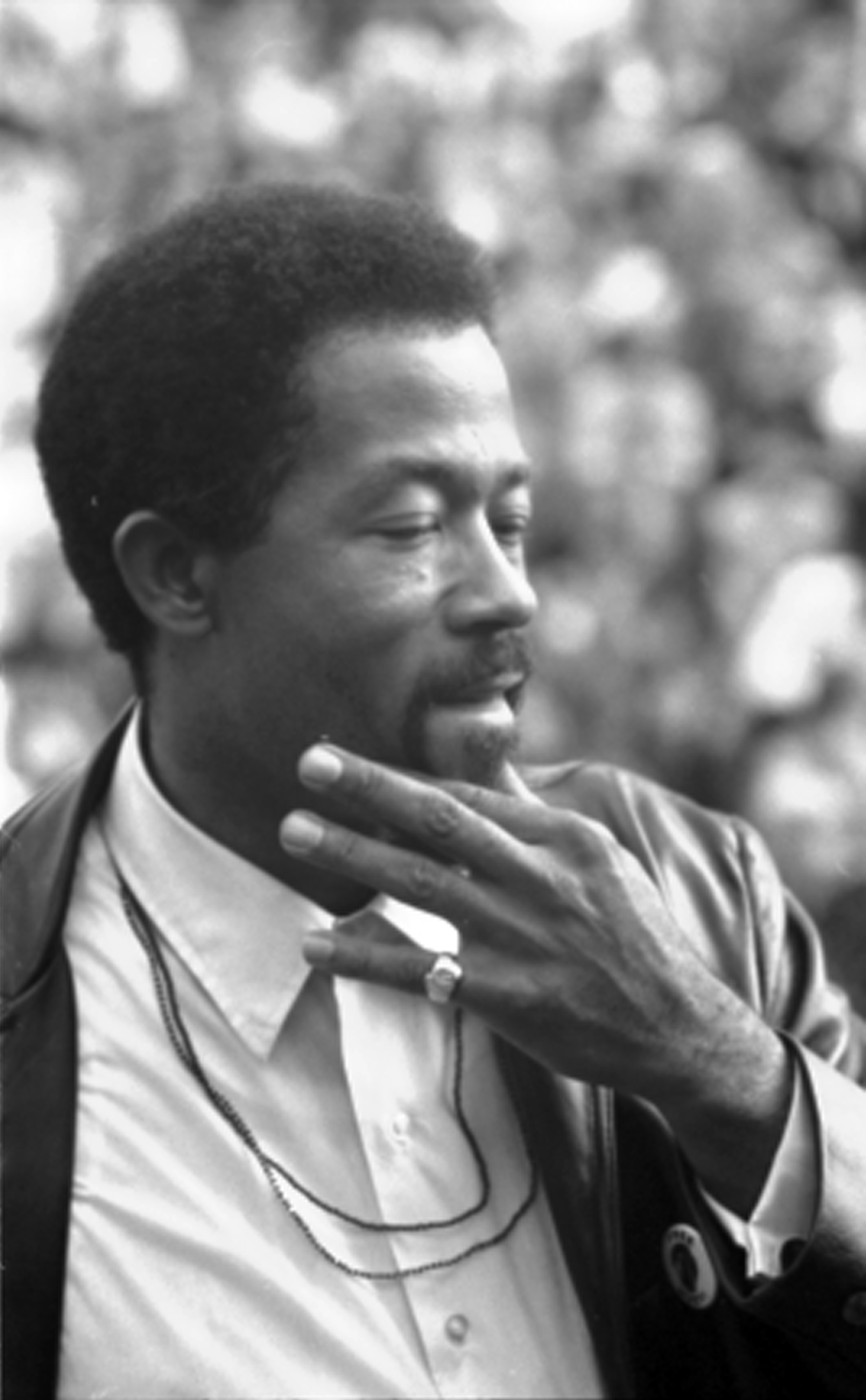
Cleaver

- Eldridge Cleaver was paroled from California's Folsom State Prison, with the help of Edward M. Keating, the publisher of Ramparts magazine, and immediately hired there as a staff writer. Ramparts had published letters written by Cleaver, while he was serving a sentence for rape and attempted murder, and these would be released in 1968 as the bestselling and book, Soul on Ice. He would soon become active as the spokesman for the Black Panther Party.
- Breakfast at Tiffany's, a musical based on the bestselling book by Truman Capote (which had been adapted to a successful film) opened on Broadway for a preview, and became one of the more memorable flops in theater history. After it was performed four times at the Majestic Theatre, which had planned to formally launch it on December 26, the Bob Merrill musical was closed down by its producer, David Merrick, who ran an advertisement in The New York Times to explain, "Rather than subject the drama critics and the theatre-going public— who invested one million dollars in advance ticket sales— to an excruciatingly boring evening, I have decided to close the show... the closing is entirely my fault."
- The two major wire services used by American newspapers, the Associated Press and United Press International, began referring to the Southeast Asian nation where the U.S. was fighting a war as "Vietnam", replacing the prior preferred spelling of "Viet Nam" that continued to be used by both the South (Việt Nam Cộng Hòa) and the North (Việt Nam Dân chủ Cộng hòa) when referring to their Republic and Democratic Republic, respectively.
- The West German cargo ship MV Contentia collided with the Bull lightvessel (Trinity House, UK) and sank at the mouth of the River Humber, and the West German coaster MV Elke collided with another ship and sank in the Humber Estuary.
- Born:
  - Último Dragón (ring name for Yoshihiro Asai), Japanese professional wrestler described as "the most decorated wrestler in recorded history", J-Crown, NWA and WCW champion; in Nagoya
  - Royce Gracie, Brazilian professional mixed-martial artist and UFC Hall of Famer; in Rio de Janeiro
- Died:
  - Nellie Briercliffe, 77, English mezzo-soprano opera singer
  - Amram Aburbeh, 72, Israeli Sephardi Jewish rabbi

== December 13, 1966 (Tuesday) ==
- The U.S. Department of Defense confirmed for the first time that a U.S. Air Force pilot was being held captive in the People's Republic of China, after his F-104 Starfighter went down over China's Hainan Island. China had long maintained that it had an American pilot who had been captured alive in its territory. The United States said that Captain Philip E. Smith had either been shot down or had had a mechanical failure on September 20, 1965.
- Richard Paul Pavlick, a 79-year old retired postal worker who had attempted to assassinate President-elect John F. Kennedy on December 11, 1960, was released from a mental hospital in his home state of New Hampshire.
- Born: Michaelangelo "Mike" Volpi, Italian-born American entrepreneur, chief strategist for Cisco Systems in its acquisition of 70 companies over five years; in Milan

== December 14, 1966 (Wednesday) ==
- Voters in Spain overwhelmingly approved the new Ley Orgánica, a new constitution that had been proposed by Spain's President, Generalissimo Francisco Franco, and that provided for the eventual restoration of the monarchy. Opponents of the proposed constitution had been prohibited from campaigning against it, although they had been allowed to ask people not to vote in the election at all. According to the government, nearly 89% of registered voters turned out at the polls, and 93.3% of them voted yes on the proposal, while 3.2% voted no, and 3.5% did not properly mark their ballots.
- The launch of the second unmanned Soyuz rocket ended disastrously when one of the boosters on the rocket was not able to reach the required minimal thrust. The R-7 engines were shut down, and the workers on the launch pad came in to work on the rocket, when an automatic escape system suddenly activated, sending the capsule aloft and setting the third stage on fire. Moments later, the entire rocket exploded on the launch pad, killing one technician and seriously injuring others who were not able to take cover quickly enough.
- In Australia, the First Holt Ministry ended its term.
- Born:
  - Helle Thorning-Schmidt, Prime Minister of Denmark from 2011 to 2015 and the first woman to hold the office; in Rødovre
  - Tim Skold, Swedish multi-instrumentalist rock musician; in Skövde
- Died: Verna Felton, 76, American character actress

== December 15, 1966 (Thursday) ==
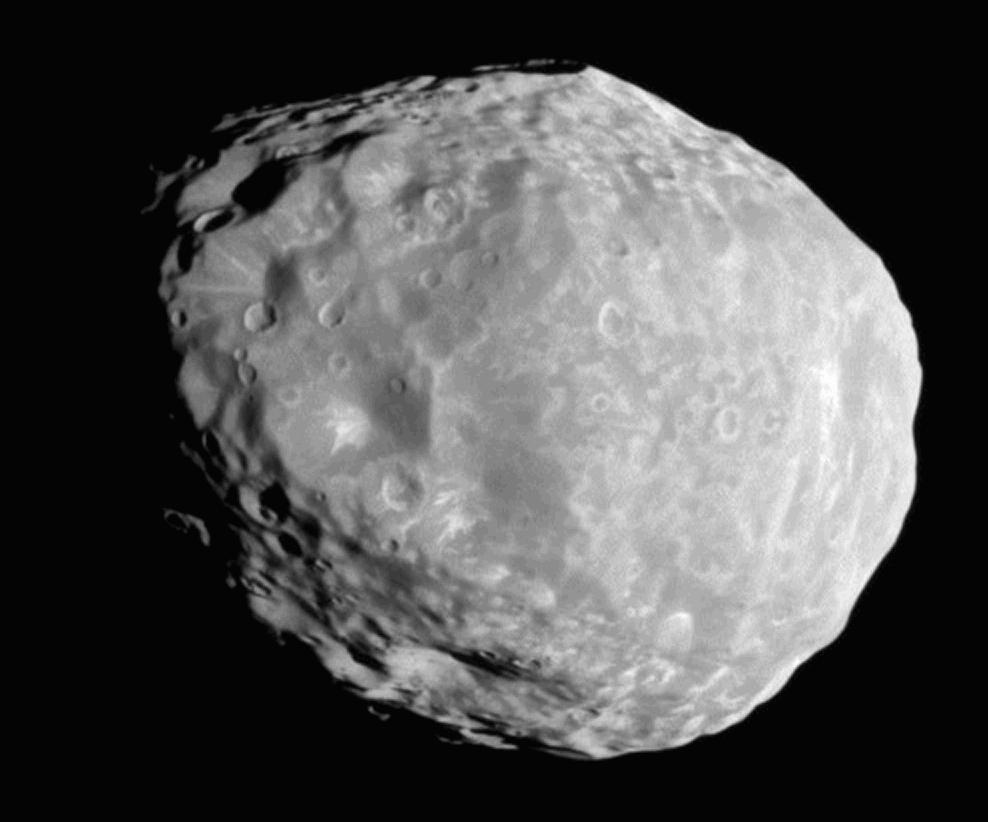
Janus

- Janus, one of the moons of Saturn and the tenth to be given a name by Earth astronomers, was first identified. Audouin Dollfus, an astronomer of the Meudon Observatory in the Meudon suburb of Paris, spotted it that evening and on the next two. On December 18, Richard L. Walker of the U.S. Naval Observatory station in Flagstaff, Arizona took two photographs which were soon determined to be showing the object identified by Dollfus as the Earth's position relative to Saturn was such that Saturn's rings can be "seen edge-on and become virtually invisible", an event that happens at 14-year intervals. Walker would report confirmation of Dollfus's discovery in January 1967. Credited by the International Astronomical Union with discovery of the 10th moon on February 1, 1967, Dollfus proposed that the object be named for the Roman demigod Janus, who was said to have harbored the god Saturn when the latter fell out of favor with Jupiter.
- Former First Lady Jacqueline Kennedy announced in a statement that she would seek an injunction against the publication of William Manchester's book, The Death of a President, slated to be released in April by Harper & Row Publishers, with excerpts to be printed in the January 10, 1967, issue of LOOK Magazine. Mrs. Kennedy, the widow of President John F. Kennedy, said that the book violated a contract she had signed with the author, Manchester. She added that the book was "in part both tasteless and distorted" and made "inaccurate and unfair references to other individuals". "I am shocked that Mr. Manchester would exploit the emotional state in which I recounted my recollections to him early in 1964." Specifically, she said that the agreement between her and Manchester was that the book "may not be published before November 22, 1968", nor without approval of the text by Mrs. Kennedy and by Robert F. Kennedy. The threat of injunction was dropped 12 days later after LOOK Magazine agreed not to print certain segments, and Harper & Row agreed to delay publication, but Mrs. Kennedy would continue to pursue legal action against the author.
- Born: Katja von Garnier, German film director; in Wiesbaden, West Germany
- Died: Walt Disney, 65, American animated film producer who founded an independent film company that became a multimillion-dollar empire of film studios and amusement parks, died at St. Joseph Hospital in Burbank, California. The immediate cause of death was acute circulatory collapse that had been brought on by lung cancer. Flags on all government buildings in Los Angeles County were ordered lowered to half-staff in his honor.

== December 16, 1966 (Friday) ==
- By an 11–0 vote, the United Nations Security Council approved UNSC Resolution 232, an oil embargo and other economic sanctions, against Rhodesia. Permanent members France and the Soviet Union, and members Mali and France, all abstained. Other proposed amendments failed to gain enough support, including an amendment that suggested that the United Kingdom "use every means, including force" to bring about the downfall of the white-minority government of Ian Smith. Six members (the Soviet Union, Mali, Jordan, Bulgaria, Uruguay and Nigeria) supported the use of force amendment, two short of the necessary 8 of 15 majority necessary.
- The International Covenant on Economic, Social and Cultural Rights and the International Covenant on Civil and Political Rights were adopted unanimously (105–0) by the General Assembly, as Resolution 2200 A (XXI). The covenant on economic rights would enter into force nine years later, on January 3, 1976, and the covenant on civil rights would take effect on March 23, 1976.
- Born: Dennis Wise, English soccer football midfielder, with 21 appearances for the English national team between 1991 and 2000; in Kensington, London
- Died: Charles Crawford Davis, 73, American inventor and audio engineer who patented the Davis Drive System for synchronizing sound and picture in cameras and projectors.

== December 17, 1966 (Saturday) ==
- The first successful pancreatic transplant on a human being took place at the University of Minnesota, as a team of surgeons led by William D. Kelly and Richard C. Lillehei carried out "a duct-ligated segmental pancreas graft" into an unidentified 28-year-old woman, effectively reversing type 1 diabetes, and resulting "in immediate insulin independence". That patient would pass away in late May, four and a half months after the surgery, from a lung infection and pneumonia, but the transplanted organ would continue to function until her death. In the first 50 years after the procedure, there would be 42,000 reported pancreas transplantations, with 27,000 in the United States alone.
- Biosatellite I, an American orbiting satellite that carried more than 10,000,000 specimens of insects, plant specimens and bacteria as a test of the effect of prolonged weightlessness and radiation on life forms, was lost three days after its launch from Cape Kennedy. The craft, the first mission of a $100,000,000 "bring 'em back alive" program, carried 10,000 fruit flies because "three days in the life of a fruit fly" was considered the equivalent of "years in a human". Other items on board, separated by species into air-conditioned compartments, were "1,000 flour beetles, 560 parasitic wasps, 10 million bread mold, 9 pepper plants, 120 frog eggs and 875 amoebae". However, a retrorocket on the satellite failed to ignite, and instead of parachuting into the Pacific Ocean for recovery, Biosatellite I remained in an "uncontrolled orbit" from which it would eventually re-enter the atmosphere and burn up.
- In the Italian province of Trapani, on the island of Sicily, a court sentenced Mafioso Filippo Melodia to 11 years in prison for abducting and raping 17-year-old Franca Viola, marking the first time in Sicily that a rape victim and her family successfully sought criminal prosecution of the rapist, rather than following the long-standing Sicilian tradition of forcing a "mending marriage" (matrimonio riparatore, similar to a "shotgun marriage" in other nations) of perpetrator to victim.
- Two days after his death, the body of Walt Disney was cremated at Glendale, California. Two years later, the urban myth was started that Disney had had his body cryogenically frozen until the day that he could be restored to life, with the earliest identified suggestion in print being in the French magazine Ici Paris in 1969.
- The United Nations established UNCITRAL (United Nations Commission on International Trade Law), which would become operational on January 1, 1968, to oversee the creation of standards for the international sale of goods, international payments, commercial operations and the transport of goods by sea.
- Born: Miloš Tichý, Czech astronomer at the Kleť Observatory, who is credited with discovering over 150 asteroids and a periodic comet, and is the namesake for the asteroid 3337 Miloš and the comet P/2000 U6 Tichý; in Počátky, Czechoslovakia

== December 18, 1966 (Sunday) ==
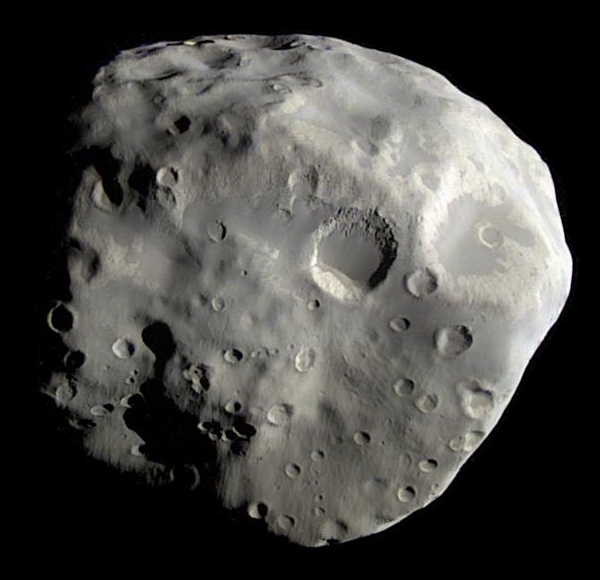
Epimethius, not noticed for 11 years

- Epimetheus, another of the moons of Saturn, was captured on photographs taken by the Mount Lemmon Observatory and reviewed by astronomer Richard L. Walker, but was initially mistaken for Janus, which had been identified three days earlier and was in the same orbit. It would not be until 1978 that Stephen Larson and John Fountain would calculate that aberrations in the orbit of Janus were "compatible with a second satellite in the same orbit". Subsequent observations by the Voyager 1 probe in 1980 would determine that Janus and Epimetheus are in the same orbit around Saturn, 135 degrees apart from each other.
- How the Grinch Stole Christmas!, based on the book of the same name by Dr. Seuss (Theodor Geisel) and narrated by Boris Karloff, was shown for the first time on CBS, becoming an annual Christmas tradition in the United States. "As a result of the television version," an author would note later, "adults and children renewed their love of Seussian tales and bought his books in record-breaking numbers." Geisel initially rejected an offer by his friend, animator Chuck Jones, to adapt the book to an animated cartoon; his wife Helen Palmer persuaded him to reconsider.
- In an NFL game at Dallas, New York Giants placekicker Pete Gogolak attempted a field goal with his right foot; the kick was blocked, and before the ball could strike the ground, Gogolak kicked it with his other foot and sent it through the uprights "much to the consternation of the players and referees". Since it had never happened before in an American football game, the game officials conferred at length before concluding that the rules only allow a player to make one kick for a field goal, and the score was disallowed.
- An Aerocondor Colombia Airlines flight from Miami to Bogotá, Colombia, crashed short of the runway while attempting to land at the El Dorado International Airport. The Super Constellation airliner carried 59 people; 13 passengers and four of the crew were killed.
- Leonid Brezhnev, the General Secretary of the Communist Party of the Soviet Union and the USSR's de facto leader, was awarded the first of four Hero of the Soviet Union medals, the highest Soviet honor, the day before his 60th birthday.
- Died: Tara Browne, 21, London socialite and an heir to the Guinness fortune, was killed in an auto accident in South Kensington after running a red light and crashing into a parked truck. He was a little more than three years away from receiving a bequest of one million pounds sterling. According to a later interview with John Lennon, the report of the investigation, printed in the Daily Mail of January 15, was an inspiration for the song "A Day in the Life".

== December 19, 1966 (Monday) ==
- The United Nations adopted the Treaty on Principles Governing the Activities of States in the Exploration and Use of Outer Space, including the Moon and Other Celestial Bodies, more commonly known as the Outer Space Treaty. It would be signed on January 27, 1967, by the United States, the Soviet Union and the United Kingdom, and enter into force on October 10, 1967.
- The Asian Development Bank (ADB) was established by an agreement that had been signed in Manila on December 2, 1965, by the original 31 member nations, including Australia, India, Indonesia, Japan, Malaysia, New Zealand, the Philippines, Singapore, South Korea, South Vietnam, and Taiwan.
- Duke Ellington began recording his album, The Far East Suite, in New York City. The nine tracks on the original album were all compositions by Ellington and Billy Strayhorn (except for one by Ellington). Outtakes from the session would be released in 1995.
- The U.S. Army deployed its new Mobile Riverine Force into combat for the first time, with the 2nd Brigade of the 9th Infantry Division arriving at Vung Tau in South Vietnam.
- Born: Alberto Tomba, Italian alpine ski champion and winner of three Olympic gold medals; in San Lazzaro di Savena

== December 20, 1966 (Tuesday) ==
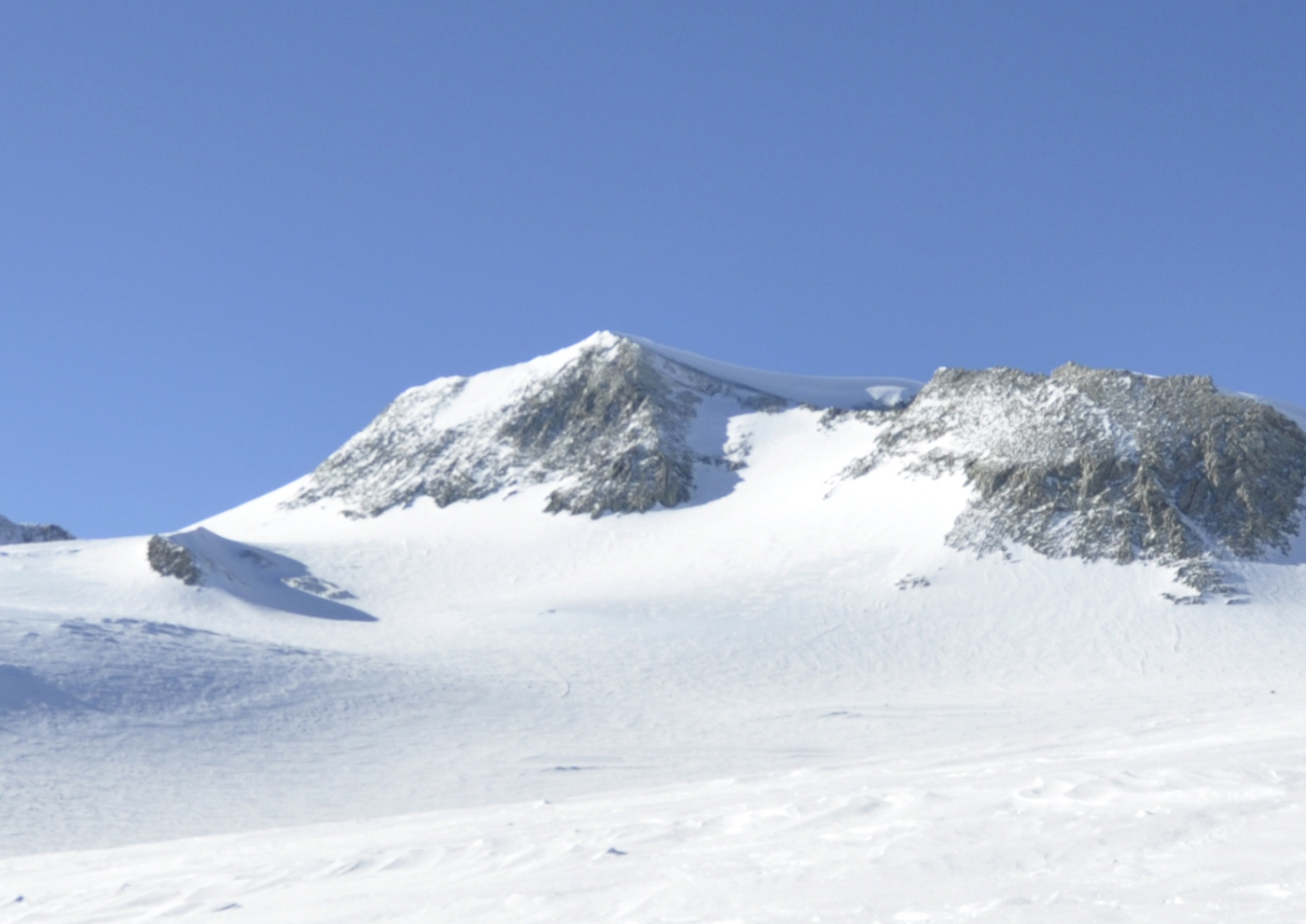
Mount Vinson

- Mount Vinson, 16,050 feet (4,890 m) in altitude and the highest peak in Antarctica, was conquered for the first time as a group of ten American climbers reached the summit. In addition to the American flag, the climbers planted the flags of the other 11 nations that had signed the Antarctic Treaty of 1959.
- British Prime Minister Harold Wilson withdrew all his previous offers to the Rhodesian government and announced that he would agree to independence only after the founding of a Black majority government.
- Born: Ed de Goey (Eduard de Goeij), Dutch professional soccer football goalkeeper in Netherlands Eredivisie league and England's Premier League, as well as the Netherlands national team; in Gouda
- Died:
  - Richard Y. Dakin, 63, American entrepreneur who founded the toy importer Dakin, Inc., the most recognized brand of stuffed animals at the time, disappeared along. Dakin, seven of his family members and a crew of two were on a twin-engine took off from Oakland, California Lockheed Lodestar, made a stop at San Diego, and then flew onward for a vacation at La Paz, Baja California Sur in Mexico. It was not until three days later that company officials realized that the airplane was missing.
  - Arturo Riccardi, 86, former Admiral and Chief of Staff of the Italian Army during World War II
  - Ali Asllani, 82, Albanian poet

== December 21, 1966 (Wednesday) ==
ITT logo

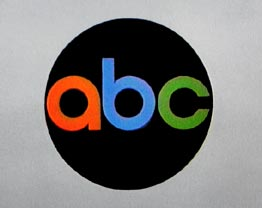
ABC logo

- The Federal Communications Commission (FCC) voted, 4–3, to permit International Telephone & Telegraph (ITT) to purchase the American Broadcasting Company (ABC) television and radio network.
- Eight schoolchildren in Windsor, Ontario were killed, and 16 others injured, when a tractor-trailer overturned while attempting a right turn, dumping ten tons of sand onto their school bus. Ranging in age from six to nine years old, the children were on their way from Frith Public School to their homes in Oldcastle when the accident happened shortly after 3:00. The weight of the sand tore a hole through the bus roof, and the cargo poured in. Some of the victims were cut by the metal of the roof, while others were buried and suffocated. Three students at the back of the bus were uninjured and able to escape out of the back of the bus.
- France and West Germany signed an agreement to allow French forces to continue to be stationed in the former French zone of West Germany, despite France's earlier withdrawal from NATO.
- Born: Kiefer Sutherland, Canadian film and TV actor, and son of film star Donald Sutherland and stage and TV actress Shirley Douglas; in London

== December 22, 1966 (Thursday) ==
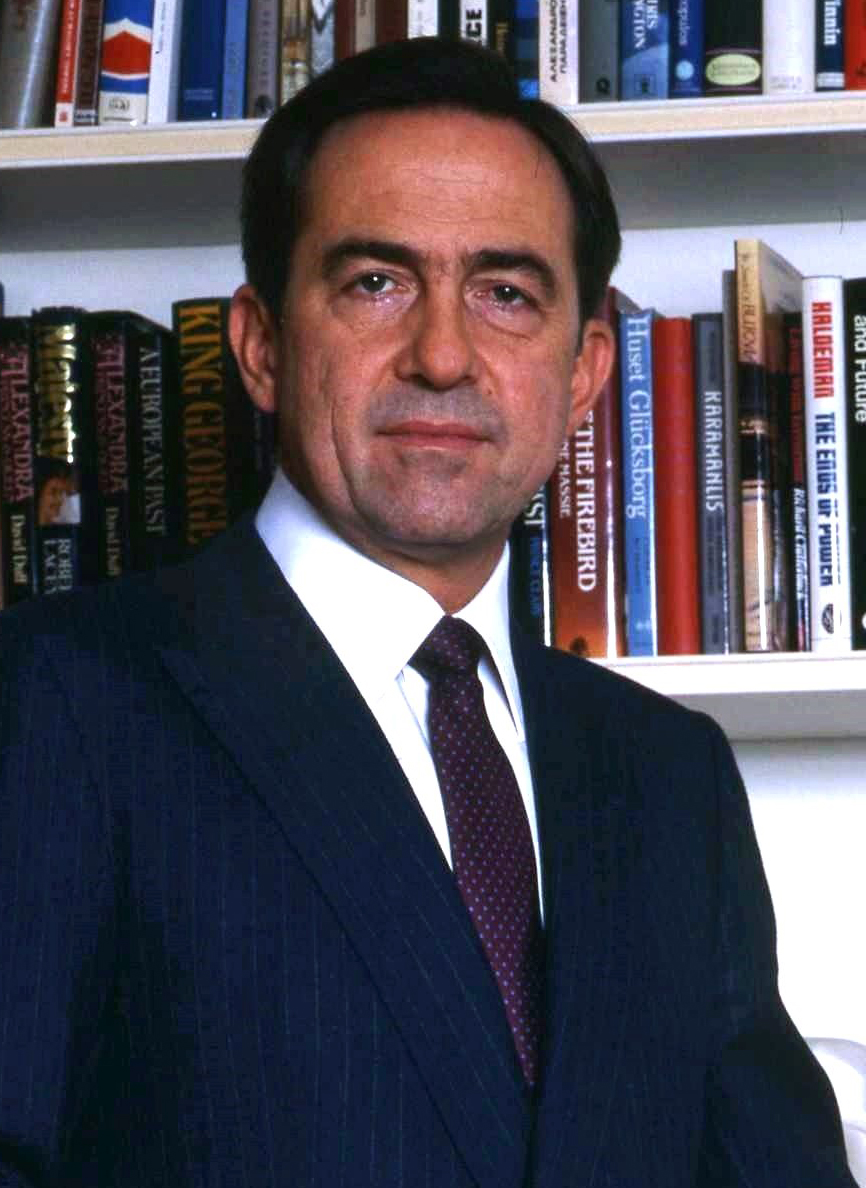
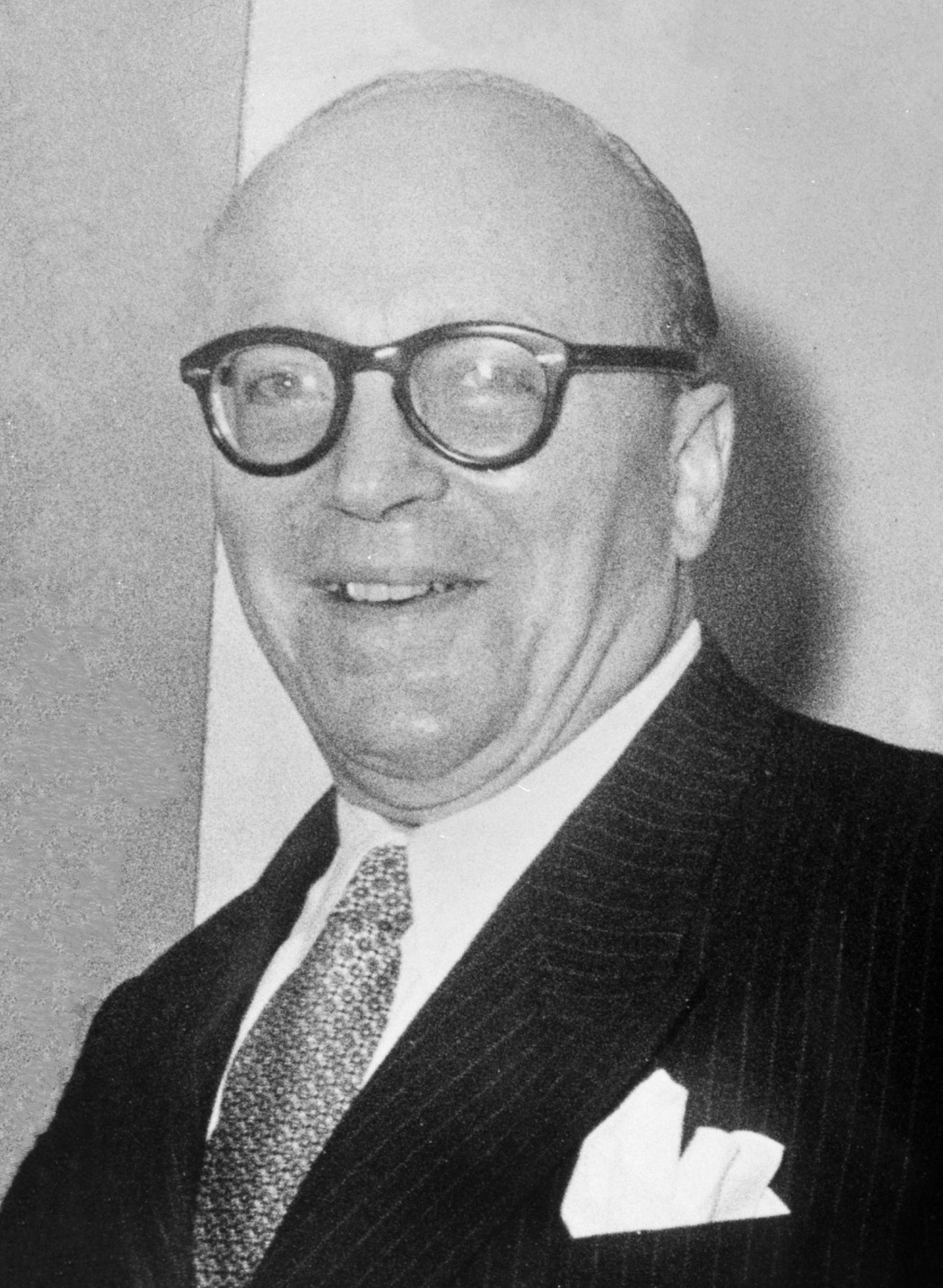
Constantine II and ex-Premier Stefanopoulos
- King Constantine II swore in Ioannis Paraskevopoulos as the new Prime Minister of Greece, the day after the collapse of the government of Prime Minister Stefanos Stefanopoulos. Two hours later, the King addressed his subjects by radio and announced that new elections for Parliament would be held in May.
- On the eve of the United Kingdom's trade ban with Rhodesia, Prime Minister Ian Smith declared that Rhodesia had become an independent republic by operation of the UN Security Council's vote for sanctions. "We are ipso facto in a position that we are no longer under the control of Britain," Smith told reporters, "and, in the circumstances, I would say we are no longer members of the British Commonwealth; if that is the position, I do not know what we have become, except a republic."
- NASA's George E. Mueller advised that the Manned Spacecraft Center (MSC) and NASA Headquarters recommended selections for the atmosphere for the planned orbiting S-IVB Workshop. The existing 100% oxygen environment would continue in the Apollo command module and for space-suit operations, while a "shirt-sleeve atmosphere" mix would be used in the Workshop, with 69% percent oxygen and 31% nitrogen at a pressure of five pounds per square inch absolute or 35 kg⋅/m^{2} per⋅second.
- Born: Dmitry Bilozerchev, Soviet Russian gymnast, eight-time gold medalist in the 1983 and 1987 World Championships and winner of three gold medals at the 1988 Olympics; in Moscow
- Died:
  - Lucy Burns, 87, American suffragette and co-founder of the National Woman's Party that successfully lobbied for the right of women to vote.
  - Harry Beaumont, 78, American film producer during the silent era
  - Robert Keith, 68, American character actor

== December 23, 1966 (Friday) ==
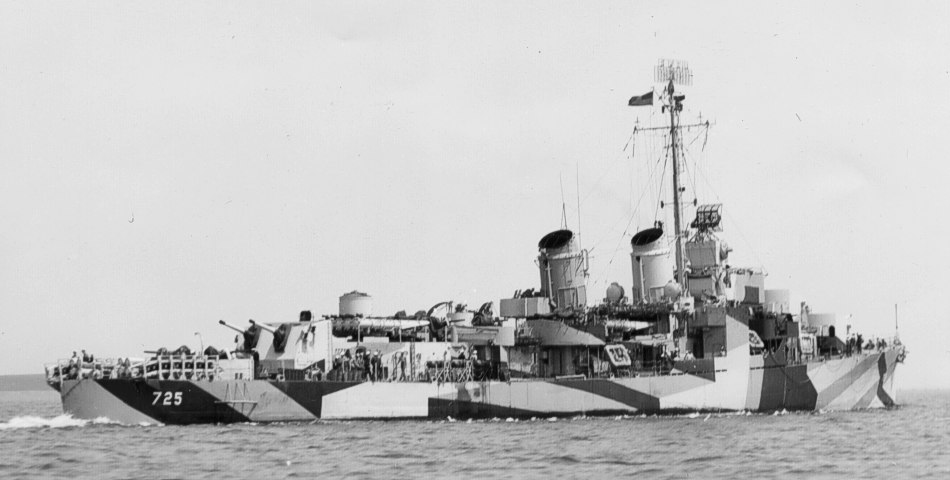
USS O'Brien

- The destroyer USS O'Brien (DD-725) became the first American ship to be struck by shells fired from North Vietnam's shore batteries. Two crewmen were killed and four wounded when the O'Brien was struck by artillery fired from coastal guns located in the Quảng Bình Province.
- The Good, The Bad, and the Ugly, directed by Sergio Leone of Italy and starring Clint Eastwood, made its debut. Featuring other actors who had been seen in A Fistful of Dollars and For a Few Dollars More (Mario Brega, Aldo Sambrell, Benito Stefanelli and Lorenzo Robledo), and filmed in Italy and Spain, the movie premiered in Italy, where it was given the title Il buono, il brutto, il cattivo, and would be released in the rest of the world in 1968, becoming the highest grossing of the "spaghetti Western" films.
- In a memorandum to the Associate Administrator for Manned Space Flight, George E. Mueller, Saturn/Apollo Applications Deputy Director John H. Disher posed a number of AAP issues needing resolution, including whether AAP should be portrayed as an "open-ended" program or whether the agency should identify a certain goal or activity as marking its completion, and whether AAP should include space rescue activities.
- Ready Steady Go!, the pioneering British pop music show on Britain's ITV network, was broadcast for the last time, after making its debut on August 9, 1963. Appearing as the last act was The Who, and the final show was subtitled "Ready Steady Gone!".
- Yugoslav police attacked students who held a meeting against the U.S. war in Vietnam. Several students were beaten and 17 were arrested and got one-month jail sentences.
- Died:
  - William Rush Dunton, 98, American psychiatrist and author, co-founder of the American Occupational Therapy Association
  - Heimito von Doderer, 70, Austrian count and prolific author

== December 24, 1966 (Saturday) ==
- Luna 13, an uncrewed spacecraft launched toward the Moon by the Soviet Union from an Earth-orbiting platform, made a soft landing at 1801 UTC (9:01 p.m. in Moscow) between craters Seleucus and Krafft in the region of Oceanus Procellarum. On its first day on the Moon, the space probe deployed two rods that could penetrate a foot deep into the lunar surface, and determined that the lunar soil was strong enough to support the weight of a large crewed spacecraft and that humans could walk on the hard soil without sinking.
- A Flying Tiger Line cargo plane crashed into the Hòa Vang District of the South Vietnamese city of Da Nang, killing at least 125 civilians and the plane's crew of four. The four-engine turboprop plane was arriving at Da Nang after taking off from Tachikawa Airfield in Japan and fell short of the runway as it attempted to land.
- Starting at 7:00 in the morning in Vietnam, a 48-hour holiday truce went into effect by agreement between the United States, South Vietnam and their allies, and North Vietnam and the Viet Cong. Five hours into the ceasefire, however, Viet Cong guerrillas fired upon Australian troops near Saigon, and six other incidents took place, including a small arms and mortar fire attack near Phú Lộc in the Thừa Thiên Province that killed a South Vietnamese soldier.
- Avianca Airlines Flight 729, a twin-engine DC-3, crashed in the Andes Mountains during a flight between Bogotá and Pasto, Colombia, killing all 29 people on board. The wreckage of the Christmas Eve flight would finally be spotted 11 days later on the side of "Las Animas", a mountain 20 minutes away from Pasto, in the mountain range separating the departments of Cauca and Nariño.
- Pope Paul VI spent Christmas Eve in Florence, fifty days after the Arno flood. He prayed in the Basilica of Santa Croce, still dirty with mud and naphtha, and celebrated Midnight Mass in the Cathedral, in the presence of thousands of faithful, including the mayor of Florence Piero Bargellini and those of other cities affected by the disaster (Venice, Trento, Grosseto and Pisa).
- Starting at 9:30 p.m., New York City's WPIX television station began a tradition of a broadcasting a show called WPIX Yule Log Christmas Greeting. In order to allow the Channel 11 employees to spend Christmas Eve with their families, station president Fred M. Thrower canceled its regular programming (at the cost of $4,000 in advertising) in favor of three hours of a looped film of a log burning in a fireplace. The picture was accompanied by Christmas music from the WPIX-FM radio station. The annual broadcast would be halted after 1989, but would be revived in 2001.
- Born: Diedrich Bader, American actor and comedian; in Alexandria, Virginia
- Died:
  - Frank Mitchell, 37, British armed robber known as "The Mad Axeman", was shot to death 12 after escaping Dartmoor Prison. The Kray twins, who had masterminded his escape, ordered his murder after quickly becoming tired of their friend.
  - Gaspar Cassadó, 69, Spanish cellist and composer
  - May Massee, 85, American children's book editor

== December 25, 1966 (Sunday) ==
- The New York Times published a front page investigative report, "A Visitor to Hanoi Inspects Damage Laid to U.S. Raids", filed by editor Harrison E. Salisbury from the capital of North Vietnam. "Contrary to the impression given by U.S. communiques," Salisbury told an American audience, "on-the-spot inspection indicates that U.S. bombing has been inflicting considerable civilian casualties and its environs for some time past." The report, first of several dispatches that would appear over the next few days in newspapers around the world, "confirmed what foreign media and the domestic radical press had long reported", an historian would later note.
- Peng Dehuai, at one time the Minister of Defense for the People's Republic of China until his purge in 1959 and replacement by Lin Biao was arrested by the Red Guards. For the remaining eight years of his life, Peng would be publicly humiliated, tortured and kept in prison until dying in his cell on November 29, 1974. After the death of Mao Zedong, the Chinese Communist Party would rehabilitate his reputation, and on December 22, 1978, would declare that Peng had been "a great revolutionary fighter and loyal member of the Party".
- A fire killed 11 crewmen on board the British fishing trawler St. Finbarr while they were at sea, 100 miles (160 km) northeast of Cartwright, Newfoundland and Labrador. The blaze broke out during a storm in the North Atlantic Ocean. Another 14 crew members were rescued by a sister ship.
- The Angolan liberation group UNITA made its first guerrilla attack against the Portuguese colonial government, invading from the Congo and raiding the border city of Teixeira de Sousa (now Luau) to disrupt the Benguela railway line.
- Died: Nicholas Dandolos, 83, Greek-born American gambler known as "Nick the Greek". An obituary would note that "Possibly half a billion dollars passed through Nick's fingers during a lifetime of wagering on dice, at card tables, and at race tracks... He was alternately a millionaire and penniless 73 times in his lifetime." Anecdotes about his winnings included $1,600,000 won on rolls of the dice in the game of craps, and $605,000 won on a single bet in poker.

== December 26, 1966 (Monday) ==
- Maulana Karenga (formerly Ronald M. Everett) and other members of the black nationalist US (United Slaves) Organization celebrated the first Kwanzaa. The Kwanzaa celebration is held during the seven days from December 26 to January 1, with each day celebrating a particular principle. Seven years later, a newspaper article from the Los Angeles Times Syndicate would provide the first national news about an alternative to Christmas and Hanukkah, and by the end of the century, Kwanzaa would be celebrated by over 13,000,000 worldwide.
- The third phase of the Cultural Revolution, referred to as the "Economic Warfare and Revolutionary Rebels" phase, began as the Chinese Communist Party printed editorials directing the Red Guards to become "revolutionary rebels" and to "carry the Revolution into the factories and farms". Within less than a month, Mao Zedong would send word to the Guards to take power from "those in authority who are taking the capitalist road", and to identify and depose anyone labeled a "capitalist roader".
- In Amritsar, Sikh leader Fateh Singh, and six of his followers, were persuaded to end their plans for self-immolation. Fateh, who had been fasting for nine days, accepted a glass of fruit juice from an emissary from India's Prime Minister Indira Gandhi, after agreeing to a plan by the national government to mediate the group's complaints that Chandigarh and some other Punjabi-speaking areas had been left out of the reorganized Punjab State in India.
- Born: J. (stage name for Jay Yuenger), American heavy metal guitarist for White Zombie; in Chicago
- Died:
  - Herbert Gille, 69, German Army general (Obergruppenführer) who commanded the IV SS Panzer Corps during World War II
  - Saint Elmo Brady, 82, American chemist who was the first African-American to obtain a Ph.D. in chemistry
  - Guillermo Stábile, 61, Argentine footballer and manager
  - Ina Boudier-Bakker, 91, Dutch novelist
  - Noël Gallon, 75, French composer

== December 27, 1966 (Tuesday) ==
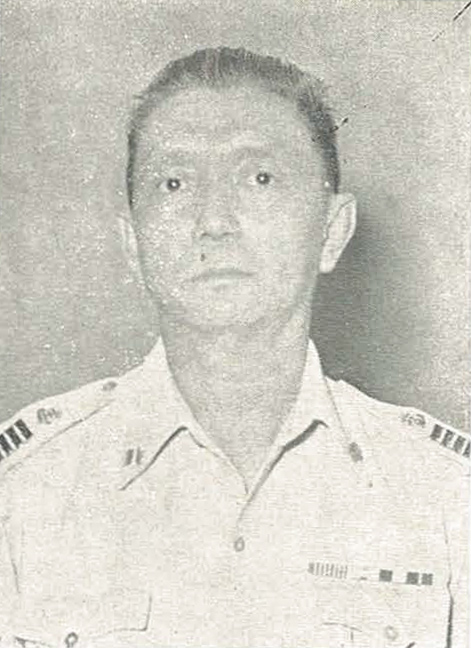
Lie Zheng Zhoan, now Jahja Darma

- The Presidium Cabinet of Indonesia, led by Prime Minister Suharto, issued a directive with the title Name Changing Policy for Indonesian Citizens With Chinese Names. As a consequence of the break between Indonesia and the People's Republic of China, the minority Chinese Indonesians were pressured to demonstrate their commitment to Indonesia by adopting Indonesian-sounding names in place of those they were born with. Examples include national hero Jahja Daniel Dharma (born Lie Zheng Zhoan); automotive tycoon Willem Soeryadjaya (Jia Kian Liong); Brigadier General Teddy Jusuf (Him Tek Jie); Jakarta Governor Basuki Tjahaja Purnama (Zhong Wanxue); and badminton champion Alan Budikusuma (Goei Zhienphang).
- Vladimir Matskevich, the Soviet Union's Minister of Agriculture and Food, announced that his nation had reaped an all-time record for grain harvests, and would be able to restock granaries that had been depleted by several previous years of shortages that had required the USSR to buy wheat from western nations. Matskevich said that the 171,000,000 tons of grain was 11 million more than had been expected, but that it would still be cheaper to have wheat shipped from Canada to the eastern republics, rather than to transport domestic produce by railroad.
- The city of Halhal, located in North Yemen and a supporter of the former King of Yemen in a civil war against the Yemen Arab Republic, was attacked by Egyptian bombers that used poison gas against the inhabitants.
- Born:
  - Goldberg (William Goldberg), American professional wrestling champion and former professional football player; in Bonsall, California
  - Chris Abani, Nigerian-born American author; in Afikpo
- Died:
  - Ernest K. Bramblett, 65, U.S. Congressman for California (from 1947 to 1955), whose career ended after he was convicted of accepting kickbacks
  - Wivi Lönn (Olivia Mathilda Lönn), 94, Finnish architect

== December 28, 1966 (Wednesday) ==
- Nearly eight years after Fidel Castro assumed control of the nation of Cuba, the Communist government there permitted 2,700 people to freely depart, as 89 people departed Havana on a Mexican DC-6 airplane. After diplomatic relations between Cuba and the United States were severed, hundreds of American citizens and a larger number of their Cuban relatives remained on the island and had not been allowed to depart. As 1966 drew to a close, there were still 880 Americans, and 1,820 members of their family living in Cuba. Their departure represented the largest government-approved exodus from Cuba up to that time.
- China conducted its fifth nuclear test, and a subsequent analysis of the radioactive fallout from the test indicated that China had developed a "triple stage bomb", considered the precursor to a hydrogen bomb because the second stage produced a fusion reaction necessary to trigger the thermonuclear explosion. The 300-kiloton bomb, the United States Atomic Energy Commission concluded, was also the "dirtiest" of the bombs, maximizing both radiation and fallout. The next test, on June 17, 1967, would be China's detonation of a hydrogen bomb.
- Twelve train passengers in the Boston suburb of Everett, Massachusetts were burned to death, and another 20 seriously injured, when the train they were on crashed into a heating oil truck that had stalled on the tracks.
- Born:
  - Thaworn Wiratchant, Thai professional golfer and Asian Tour champion; in Nakhon Pathom
  - Kaliopi (Kaliopi Bukle), Macedonian singer-songwriter; in Ohrid, Yugoslavia
- Died: Frank Chodorov, 79, American conservative political activist and champion of the "Old Right"

== December 29, 1966 (Thursday) ==
- In New Orleans, the United States Court of Appeals for the Fifth Circuit ordered three school systems in Alabama and four in Louisiana to desegregate their classrooms before the beginning of the next school year, and to immediately raise the quality level of all-Negro schools to that of all-white schools. "The clock has ticked to the last 'tick' for tokenism and delay in the name of deliberate speed," wrote Judge John Minor Wisdom, who delivered the unanimous decision of the three-judge panel. The reference to "deliberate speed" was from the U.S. Supreme Court decision, 11 years earlier, in the followup to Brown v. Board of Education; Chief Justice Earl Warren's use of the phrase in the majority opinion had been interpreted by opponents of desegregation as a reference to the slow process of deliberation rather than an intention to move speedily. Affected were the city schools of Fairfield and Bessemer, and Jefferson County, Alabama; and the schools in the Louisiana parishes of Bossier, Caddo, Claiborne and Jackson.
- Argentina became one of the first nations to extend its territorial limits to 200 miles (320 km) offshore. Other nations that would follow would include the Dominican Republic (1967); Bangladesh (1974); India, France, Norway and Mexico (1976), Cuba and Burma (1977) and Spain (1978).

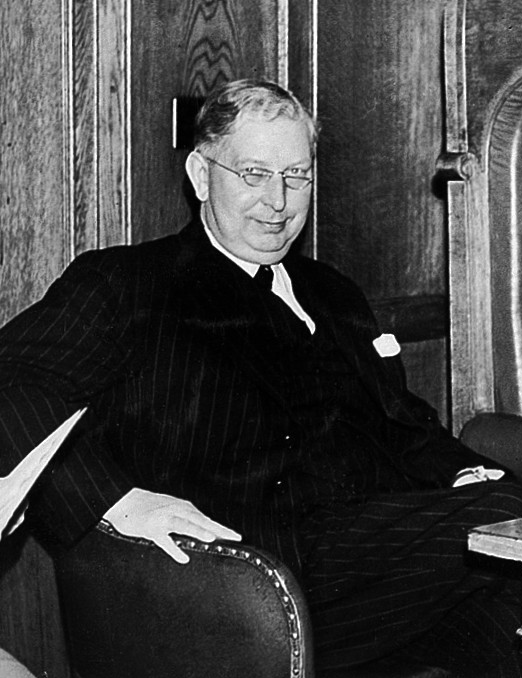
Sir Russell Brain

- Died:
  - Russell Brain, 1st Baron Brain, 71, British neurologist and author of Brain's Diseases of the Nervous System, editor of the medical journal Brain.
  - Pierre Nothomb, 79, Belgian writer and extreme right-wing politician

== December 30, 1966 (Friday) ==
- The "Kangping Avenue Incident" took place on a major thoroughfare in Shanghai, in a street battle between thousands of members of two of China's labor organizations. The 30,000 members of the "Red Defenders Battalion" marched to the Shanghai City Hall and the offices of Mayor Cao Diqiu and First Secretary Chen Pixian of the city's Communist Party organization. Upon learning what was happening, Wang Hongwen, leader of the Workers Command Post, ordered 100,000 members of his organization to head off the Defenders. The two groups met each other on Kangping Avenue and a violent clash broke out. According to historians of the Cultural Revolution, "this event was generally considered to be the beginning of the massive factional violence that subsequently occurred throughout China."
- The United States and the United Kingdom entered into an agreement for American use of the island of Diego Garcia in the British Indian Ocean Territory (BIOT) for fifty years, giving the U.S. a base in the Indian Ocean, but at the cost of the forced relocation of 2,000 other residents of the other 59 islands in the Chagos Archipelago. The lease is set to expire on December 30, 2016, and has not been renewed pending threatened litigation by former residents.
- Operation Marigold, a secret attempt to reach a compromise solution to the Vietnam War, failed after attempts by Polish diplomat Janusz Lewandowski and the Italian ambassador in Saigon, Giovanni D'Orlandi, in collaboration with American ambassador in Saigon, Henry Cabot Lodge Jr. Polish Foreign Minister Adam Rapacki relayed Hanoi's final rejection to the U.S. Ambassador in Warsaw, John A. Gronouski.
- American and South Vietnamese troops crossed the border into the Svay Rieng Province of Cambodia in pursuit of a fleeing Viet Cong force, and conducted a ground and air assault on the village of Ba Thu with 40 helicopters and two F-105 fighters. In 1970, the U.S. would invade Cambodia in an expansion of the Vietnam War.
- NASA Headquarters officially promulgated mission objectives of the AAP-l and AAP-2 flights. They were to conduct a low-altitude, low-inclination Earth-orbital mission with a three-person crew for a maximum of 28 days using a spent S-IVB stage as an OWS; to provide for reactivation and reuse of the OWS for subsequent missions within one year from initial launch; and to perform test operations with the lunar mapping and survey system in Earth orbit.

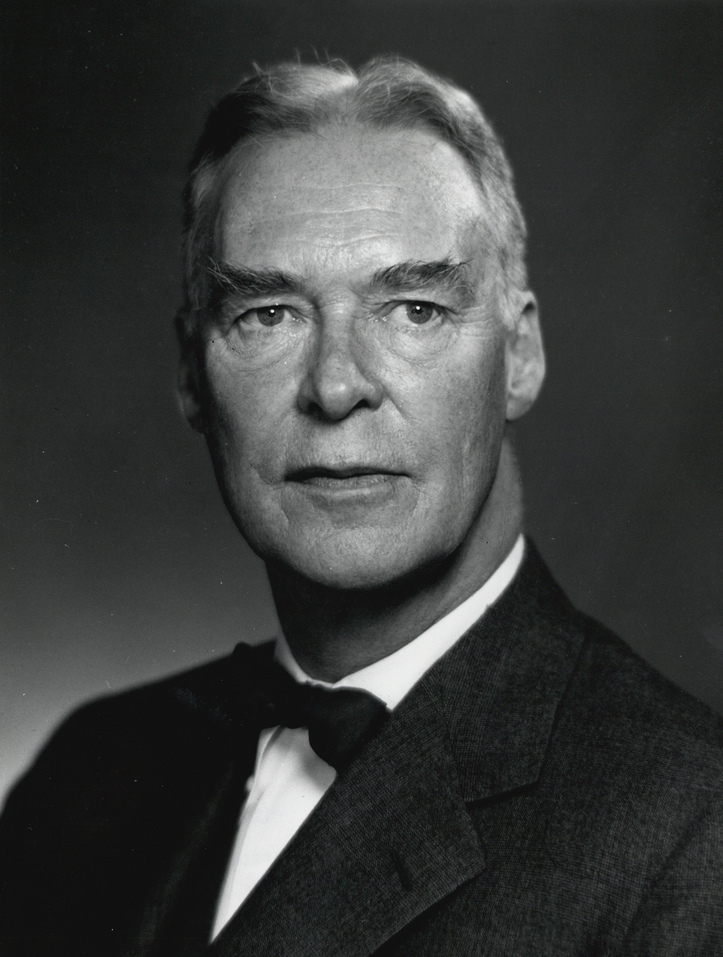
Herter

- Died: Christian Herter, 71, former U.S. Secretary of State (1959–1961) and former Governor of Massachusetts (1953–1957)

== December 31, 1966 (Saturday) ==
- In the most expensive art theft in history up to that time, thieves stole eight paintings from London's Dulwich Art Gallery, the oldest art museum in the United Kingdom, and demanded a ransom of 100,000 pounds sterling (worth, at the time, $280,000) for their safe return. The paintings themselves were considered worth more than $20,000,000. Taken were three works by Peter Paul Rubens (Ceres and Two Nymphs with a Cornucopia, The Three Graces and Saint Barbara fleeing from her Father) and three by Rembrandt van Rijn (Girl at a Window, A Young Man, and Jacob III de Gheyn), along with A Woman playing a Clavichord, by Gerrit Dou and Susannah and the Elders by Adam Elsheimer). Three of the paintings would be recovered a couple of days later, and the next evening, the other five would be found "wrapped in old newspapers behind a bush" at Streatham Common, a few miles from the gallery.
- In Ollolai, a Barbagia village, Francesco Pira, his wife Francesca and his nephew Michele, 10 years old, were shot dead in the back of the head by the outlaw Antonio Casula while they were watching the end-of-the-year show on television. Pira, a blacksmith by profession, had a criminal record and was a carabineers’ informant. The crime shook Italian public opinion; the Minister of the Interior Paolo Emilio Taviani sent a special unit of 500 police agents (the blue berets) to Sardinia. Casula would die in a shootout with the blue berets on April 23, 1967.
- In the tiny principality of Andorra, Francesc Escude-Ferrero became the new First Syndic, the chief executive officer as selected by the General Council for a term of three years. He succeeded Julià Reig Ribó, and, after serving a second three-year term, would relinquish the office back to Reig Ribó on December 31, 1972. The nominal co-princes of Andorra at the time were Ramon Iglesias i Navarri (Spain's Bishop of Urgel) and Charles de Gaulle (President of France).
- The Congolese government seized control over the Belgian copper mining company, Union Minière du Haut Katanga (UMHK), in retaliation for UMHK's failure to pay taxes owed to the Congo government, and for UHMK's support of the attempted secession of Katanga. The corporate assets were acquired by the government-operated Générale Congolaise des Minerais, later Gécamines (Générale des Carieres et des Mines).
- Former Yugoslav Vice-President Milovan Djilas, who had been imprisoned in 1962 after criticizing the Communist Party, was freed from the Sremska Mitrovica prison. President Josip Broz Tito ordered the release of Djilas, who had been considered Tito's political heir prior to the arrest on charges of disclosing state secrets in the book Conversations with Stalin.
- The Soviet reefer ship, Refrizheratornoe 10, sank in the Bering Sea, 25 miles (40 km) north of Unimak Island, Alaska, killing about 50 people of its 100-member crew. The others were rescued alive; the U.S. Coast Guard said that it had offered assistance but was declined because there were other Soviet vessels in the general area.
- Born: Maddie Taylor (formerly Matthew W. Taylor), American transgender voice actress
