= Goormaghtigh's theorem =

Goormaghtigh theorem may refer to any of various geometry results proved by the French engineer mathematician René Goormaghtigh:

- a generalization of Musselman's theorem
- a generalization of the Droz-Farny line theorem.
