= Coble variety =

In mathematics, the Coble variety is the moduli space of ordered sets of 6 points in the projective plane, and can be represented as a double cover of the projective 4-space branched over the Igusa quartic. It is a 4-dimensional variety that was first studied by Arthur Byron Coble.

== See also ==
- Coble curve
- Coble surface
- Coble hypersurface
