= Arthur Byron Coble =

American mathematician (1878–1966)

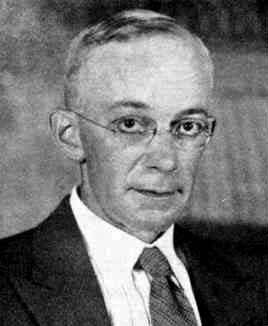
- Born: November 3, 1878; Williamstown, Pennsylvania, US
- Died: December 8, 1966 (aged 88); Harrisburg, Pennsylvania, US
- Education: Gettysburg College; Johns Hopkins University
- Scientific career
- Fields: Mathematician
- Workplaces: Johns Hopkins University; University of Illinois at Urbana-Champaign
- Doctoral advisor: Frank Morley
- Doctoral students: Josephine Chanler; Frances Harshbarger; Jessie Marie Jacobs; J. R. Musselman

Arthur Byron Coble (November 3, 1878 – December 8, 1966) was an American mathematician. He did research on finite geometries and the group theory related to them, Cremona transformations associated with the Galois theory of equations, and the relations between hyperelliptic theta functions, irrational binary invariants, the Weddle surface and the Kummer surface. He was President of the American Mathematical Society from 1933 to 1934.

== Biography ==
=== Early life ===
Arthur Coble was born on November 3, 1878, in Williamstown, Pennsylvania. His mother Emma was a schoolteacher. When Coble was born, his father Ruben was the manager of a store. Later, he became president of a bank. Coble's parents belonged to Evangelical Lutheran Church. Coble was brought up strictly as an Evangelical Lutheran; however, he rejected this Church when he reached adulthood.

Coble entered Gettysburg College in 1893, and completed his A.B. in 1897. He spent a year as a public school teacher. He entered Johns Hopkins University in 1898 to pursue his graduate studies. He completed his Ph.D. from the university in 1902. His Ph.D. thesis was The Relation of the Quartic Curve to Conics. His thesis supervisor was English-born mathematician Frank Morley. Later, Coble recalled how Morley made it "a cardinal point to have on hand a sufficient variety of thesis problems to accommodate particular tastes and capacities."

=== Academic career ===
In 1902, Coble became an instructor in mathematics at the University of Missouri. One year later, in 1903, he was appointed to Johns Hopkins University as Morley's research assistant. In 1903, he published his doctoral dissertation as The quartic curve as related to conics in the Transactions of the American Mathematical Society and took up the research assistant position in Baltimore, Maryland. In 1902, American businessman Andrew Carnegie founded the Carnegie Institution of Washington. The research of Coble and Morley were one of the first pieces of research the Institution supported. The funding of the institute was generous enough to allow Coble to use the grant to travel abroad. He traveled to Germany where he studied at Greifswald University and the University of Bonn. He wanted to work with Eduard Study, who was well known to mathematicians at Johns Hopkins University because he had taught there in 1893.

Coble returned to the United States for the start of the 1904-05 session. He was appointed an instructor in mathematics at Johns Hopkins University.

Coble married Abby Walker Adams Whitney in 1905. They had four children.

Coble was promoted to associate professor at Johns Hopkins University in 1909. He left Johns Hopkins after he was offered a full professorship at the University of Illinois at Urbana-Champaign (UIUC) in 1918. He remained at Illinois for the rest of his career. He was a visiting professor at the University of Chicago in 1919 and was at Johns Hopkins University in 1927–28. He became head of the Department of Mathematics at the UIUC in 1934 and he held that position until his retirement in 1947. During these years, Coble served on many university and college committees, including eleven years on the University Council and eight years on the executive committee of the UIUC College of Liberal Arts and Sciences.

Coble was elected to the United States National Academy of Sciences in 1924 and the American Philosophical Society in 1939.

=== American Mathematical Society ===
Coble was active with the American Mathematical Society (AMS) from 1912 to 1940. He was vice-president of the AMS in 1917. From 1920 to 1925, he edited the Transactions of the American Mathematical Society. He also was involved with editing the American Journal of Mathematics over many years between 1918 and 1933. From 1933 to 1934, he was President of the AMS. At that time, the AMS was in some financial difficulties. Coble dealt with the problem effectively.

=== Later life ===
By the time he retired in 1947 his health was already deteriorating due to Parkinson's disease. After his retirement, he accepted a one-year post at Haverford College but after teaching for one semester he resigned due to poor health. In 1956, he was involved in a car crash. Because of that crash, he was unable to walk without assistance. He then moved to Lykens, Pennsylvania, and spent his final ten years of his life there. He died on December 8, 1966, in a hospital in Harrisburg, Pennsylvania.

== Research ==
Early mathematical research papers written by Coble when he was teaching at Johns Hopkins University, include: On the relation between the three-parameter groups of a cubic space curve and a quadric surface (1906); An application of the form-problems associated with certain Cremona groups to the solution of equations of higher degree (1908); An application of Moore's cross-ratio group to the solution of the sextic equation (1911); An application of finite geometry to the characteristic theory of the odd and even theta functions (1913); and Point sets and allied Cremona groups (1915).

Coble was interested in finite geometries and the related group theory, and in the Cremona transformations related to the Galois theory of equations. Later in his career, Coble also studied the relations between hyperelliptic theta functions, irrational binary invariants, the Weddle surface and the Kummer surface.

Coble published the monograph Algebraic geometry and theta functions in the tenth volume of American Mathematical Society Colloquium Publications in 1929, and it was republished by the American Mathematical Society in 1961 and 1982.

Coble published Configurations defined by theta functions, which reviewed the invariant theory of Cremona transformations as developed by Coble in his earlier papers, in the Duke Mathematical Journal in 1939. A linear homogeneous transformation with integral coefficients is associated with a Cremona transformation. These transformations form a group, which Coble studied.

In 1940, Coble published Trilinear forms in the Duke Mathematical Journal. In 1946, he published Ternary and quaternary elimination, which extends work by mathematicians Francis Sowerby Macaulay and Bartel Leendert van der Waerden, and also extends work done by Frank Morley and Coble some 20 years earlier.

== See also ==
- Coble curve
- Coble surface
- Coble variety
- Coble hypersurface
