= Beefcake =

Form of glamour photography

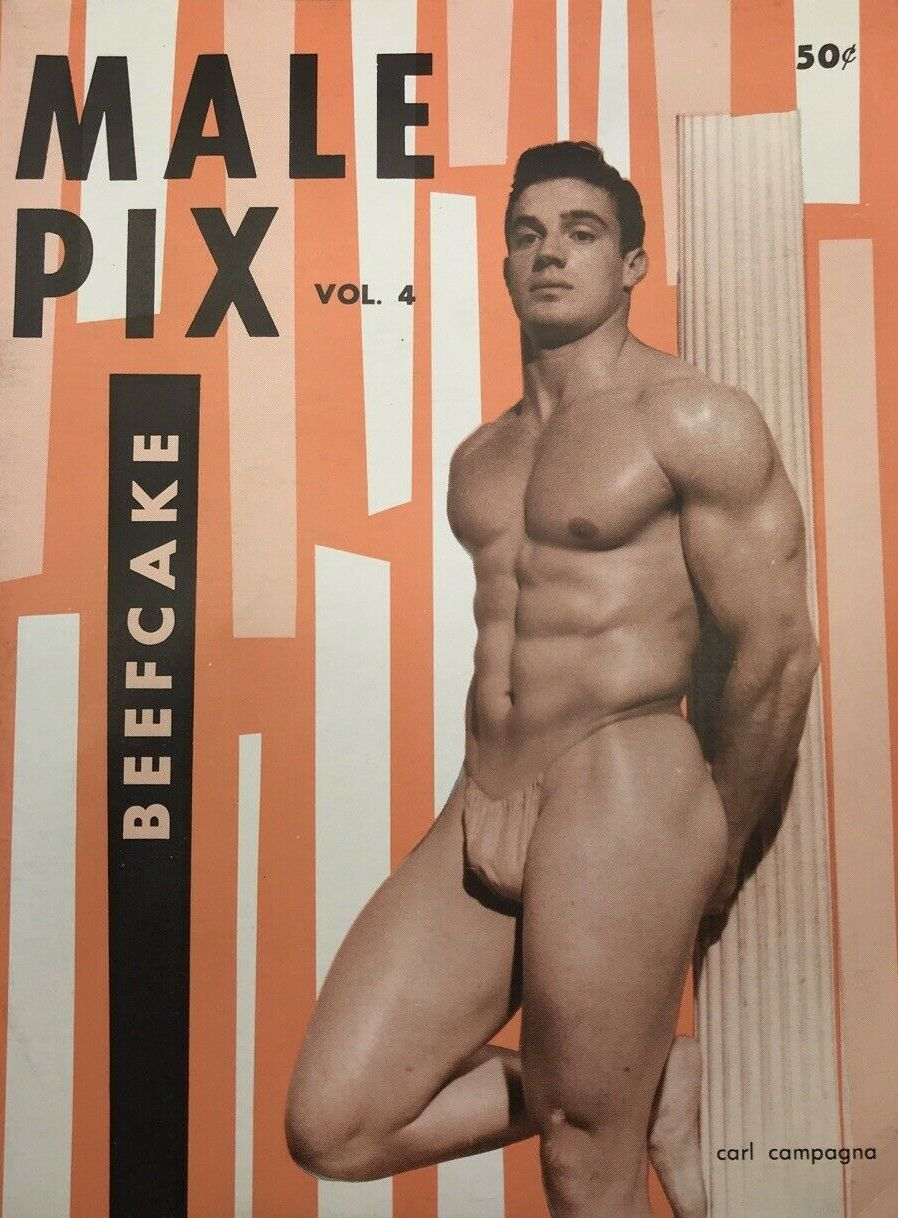
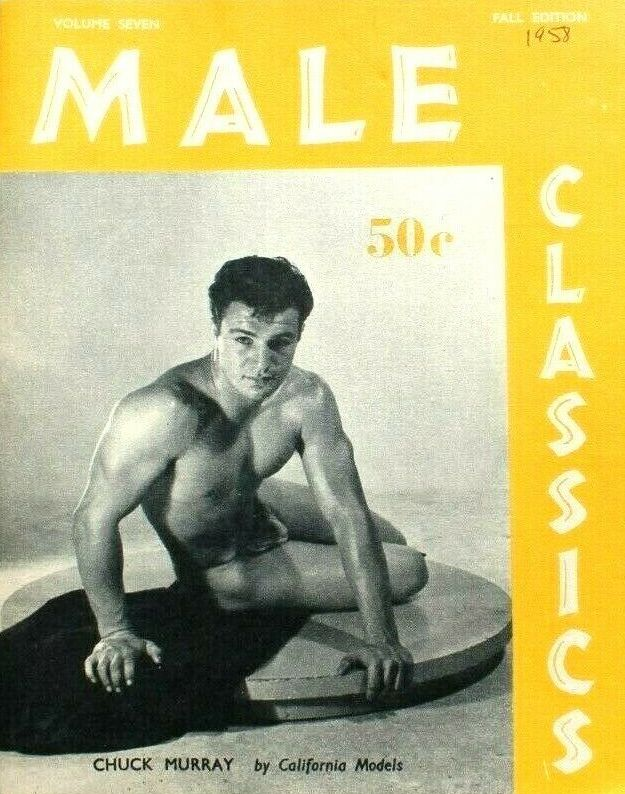
American beefcake magazines of the 1950s

Beefcake is a performance or a form of glamour photography depicting a large and muscular male body. Beefcake is also a publication genre. A role a person plays in a performance may be called beefcake. The term was believed to be first used by Hollywood columnist Sidney Skolsky.

== Actors typecast as beefcake ==
Beefcake poses by male actors were used far less frequently than cheesecake (pin-up) layouts of actresses. Nevertheless, as early as the 1920s, photographs were taken of such stars as Rudolph Valentino and Ramon Novarro to highlight their physical appeal. Male physique shots of famous stars were even less frequent during the early talking picture era, outside of stars of jungle films such as Johnny Weissmuller (Tarzan) and Buster Crabbe. The 1940s saw a rise in shirtless shots of such stars as Tyrone Power, Guy Madison, Sterling Hayden and Victor Mature; and in the 1950s movie magazines began running swimsuit shots of actors such as Tony Curtis, Rock Hudson, Tab Hunter, Jeff Chandler, Robert Conrad and Robert Wagner almost as frequently as they did with actresses. This period also included the rise of bodybuilding magazines, which continue to be popular to the present day, as well as musclemen movie stars such as Steve Reeves who were often barely dressed in their action/adventure films. In the 1980s, heavily muscular actors Arnold Schwarzenegger, Lou Ferrigno, and Sylvester Stallone continued to star in beefcake-type action/adventure movies (such as Conan the Barbarian or Hercules).

== 1970 to present ==
The 1970s proved a golden age for beefcake with the debut of Playgirl magazine and its completely nude pictorials of men, Cosmopolitan magazine's famous semi-nude centerfolds of actors including Burt Reynolds, and the rise of pornography directed at both female and gay male audiences in both magazines and films.

Today, it is common to see beefcake shots of male sex symbols on the cover of general interest magazines. For many actors and models, shirtless poses are their most revealing, in line with their conservative images.

In advertisement, beefcake male models have become a popular ingredient for "spicy" (and often humorous) commercial spots; for example, British pop star Nick Kamen remains most famous for his 1985 beefcake performance in Levi's "Launderette" TV commercial. In the ad, he strips down in order to stone-wash his blue jeans in a 1950s style public laundromat while he waits clad only in boxer shorts; it was selected for "The 100 Greatest TV Ads" in 2000 and followed by many others, often bare-chested.

Many professional male bodybuilders advertise their services, offering advice concerning nutrition and training, sometimes marketing their videos in which training programmes are demonstrated.

A 1999 film of the same name, Beefcake, details the history of the Athletic Model Guild, an early company known for their photos of men in various publications.

== See also ==
- Bara (genre)
- Himbo
