= Coble hypersurface =

In algebraic geometry, a Coble hypersurface is one of the hypersurfaces associated to the Jacobian variety of a curve of genus 2 or 3 by Arthur Coble.

There are two similar but different types of Coble hypersurfaces.

- The Kummer variety of the Jacobian of a genus 3 curve can be embedded in 7-dimensional projective space under the 2-theta map, and is then the singular locus of a 6-dimensional quartic hypersurface (Coble 1982), called a Coble hypersurface.
- Similarly the Jacobian of a genus 2 curve can be embedded in 8-dimensional projective space under the 3-theta map, and is then the singular locus of a 7-dimensional cubic hypersurface (Coble 1917), also called a Coble hypersurface.

== See also ==
- Coble curve (dimension 1)
- Coble surface (dimension 2)
- Coble variety (dimension 4)
