= Marion Elizabeth Stark =

American mathematician

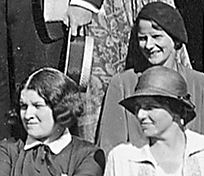
- M. Stark (upper), R. Politzer (lower left), F. Harshbarger, ICM 1932
- Born: August 23, 1894; Norwich, Connecticut
- Died: April 15, 1982 (aged 87); Waterford, New Jersey
- Resting place: Norwich, Connecticut
- Education: Brown University; University of Chicago
- Scientific career
- Workplaces: Wellesley College
- Thesis: A Self-Adjoint Boundary value Problem Associated with a Problem of the Calculus of Variations (1926)
- Doctoral advisors: Leonard Eugene Dickson, Gilbert Ames Bliss

Marion Elizabeth Stark (23 Aug 1894 – 15 April 1982) was an American mathematician. She was one of the first women to receive a Ph.D. in mathematics.

== Education and career ==
She got her A.B. in 1916, and her A.M. in 1917, both from Brown University. In 1917, she became the professor of mathematics Meredith College in Raleigh, North Carolina. In autumn 1919, she started teaching in Wellesley College as a part-time instructor, while attending courses of Helen Abbot Merrill and Mabel M. Young. In the 1923 summer quarter, and, supported by a fellowship, in autumn 1924 through summer 1925, she studied at the University of Chicago where she received her Ph.D. in 1926.

In 1927, she was appointed assistant professor of mathematics at Wellesley, in 1936, she was promoted to an associate professor there. In 1945, she was promoted to a professorship; in 1946, she became Chairman of the Department. In 1960, she retired from Wellesley after 40 years, her last rank being a Lewis Atterbury Stimson Professor of Mathematics.

== Recognition ==
Stark was named a Fellow of the American Association for the Advancement of Science in 1938.
