= Frances Harshbarger =

American mathematician (1902–1987)

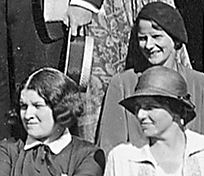
- Upper: M. Stark, Lower, left to right: R. Politzer, F. Harshbarger, ICM 1932
- Born: August 16, 1902; Quimby, Iowa, US
- Died: February 11, 1987 (aged 84); Cuyahoga Falls, Ohio, US
- Resting place: Woodbine, Iowa
- Education: Grinnell College; University of Illinois
- Scientific career
- Fields: Mathematics
- Workplaces: Kent State University
- Thesis: The Geometric Configuration Defined by a Special Algebraic Relation of Genus Four (1930)
- Doctoral advisor: Arthur Byron Coble

Frances Harshbarger (16 August 1902, Quimby, Iowa – 11 February 1987, Cuyahoga Falls, Ohio) was an American mathematician.

== Education ==
She obtained her B.A. with honors in 1923 at Grinnell College, and went to West Virginia University to serve as a half-time teacher and simultaneously work on her mathematics graduation; in 1925 she finished her M.A. After that she became head of the mathematics department of Potomac State College in Keyser, West Virginia. In 1927 to 1929, she was an assistant, in 1929 to 1930 a fellow, at the University of Illinois. In 1930, she obtained her Ph.D. in mathematics with a thesis in algebraic geometry, advised by A. B. Coble. She was one of the first American women who obtained a mathematics Ph.D. degree.

== Career ==
Thereafter, she worked as a professor in the American College for Girls, the university section of Robert College, in Istanbul, Turkey. She attended the 1932 International Congress of Mathematicians in Zürich as an official delegate. In 1934, she returned to the United States to teach at the high school associated with the University of Chicago. For the rest of her career, she served at Kent State University in Ohio, as an appointed instructor since 1935, an assistant professor since 1936, an associate professor since 1942, and a professor since 1946, until she retired in 1972, as emeritus professor.
