= Musselman's theorem =

About a common point of certain circles defined by an arbitrary triangle

In Euclidean geometry, Musselman's theorem is a property of certain circles defined by an arbitrary triangle.

Specifically, let $T$ be a triangle, and $A$, $B$, and $C$ its vertices. Let $A^*$, $B^*$, and $C^*$ be the vertices of the reflection triangle $T^*$, obtained by mirroring each vertex of $T$ across the opposite side. Let $O$ be the circumcenter of $T$. Consider the three circles $S_A$, $S_B$, and $S_C$ defined by the points $A\,O\,A^*$, $B\,O\,B^*$, and $C\,O\,C^*$, respectively. The theorem says that these three Musselman circles meet in a point $M$, that is the inverse with respect to the circumcenter of $T$ of the isogonal conjugate or the nine-point center of $T$.

The common point $M$ is point $X_{1157}$ in Clark Kimberling's list of triangle centers.

== History ==
The theorem was proposed as an advanced problem by John Rogers Musselman and René Goormaghtigh in 1939, and a proof was presented by them in 1941. A generalization of this result was stated and proved by Goormaghtigh.

== Goormaghtigh’s generalization ==
The generalization of Musselman's theorem by Goormaghtigh does not mention the circles explicitly.

As before, let $A$, $B$, and $C$ be the vertices of a triangle $T$, and $O$ its circumcenter. Let $H$ be the orthocenter of $T$, that is, the intersection of its three altitude lines. Let $A'$, $B'$, and $C'$ be three points on the segments $OA$, $OB$, and $OC$, such that $OA'/OA=OB'/OB=OC'/OC = t$. Consider the three lines $L_A$, $L_B$, and $L_C$, perpendicular to $OA$, $OB$, and $OC$ though the points $A'$, $B'$, and $C'$, respectively. Let $P_A$, $P_B$, and $P_C$ be the intersections of these perpendicular with the lines $BC$, $CA$, and $AB$, respectively.

It had been observed by Joseph Neuberg, in 1884, that the three points $P_A$, $P_B$, and $P_C$ lie on a common line $R$. Let $N$ be the projection of the circumcenter $O$ on the line $R$, and $N'$ the point on $ON$ such that $ON'/ON = t$. Goormaghtigh proved that $N'$ is the inverse with respect to the circumcircle of $T$ of the isogonal conjugate of the point $Q$ on the Euler line $OH$, such that $QH/QO = 2t$.
