= Droz-Farny line theorem =

Property of perpendicular lines through orthocenters

The line through $A_0,B_0,C_0$ is Droz-Farny line

In Euclidean geometry, the Droz-Farny line theorem states that two perpendicular lines through a triangle's orthocenter intersect the lines containing its sides in three pairs of points whose midpoints are collinear.

Let $T$ be a triangle with vertices $A$, $B$, and $C$, and let $H$ be its orthocenter (the common point of its three altitude lines). Let $L_1$ and $L_2$ be any two mutually perpendicular lines through $H$. Let $A_1$, $B_1$, and $C_1$ be the points where $L_1$ intersects the side lines $BC$, $CA$, and $AB$, respectively. Similarly, let $A_2$, $B_2$, and $C_2$ be the points where $L_2$ intersects those side lines. The Droz-Farny line theorem says that the midpoints of the three segments $A_1A_2$, $B_1B_2$, and $C_1C_2$ are collinear.

The theorem was stated by Arnold Droz-Farny in 1899, but it is not clear whether he had a proof.

== Proof ==
A proof can be given using Cartesian coordinates.

Take the orthocenter $H$ as the origin, with the perpendicular lines $L_1$ and $L_2$ as the $x$- and $y$-axes, respectively. Write the vertices as $A=(a_x,a_y)$, $B=(b_x,b_y)$ and $C=(c_x,c_y)$.

Since $AH$ is perpendicular to $BC$, and $BH$ is perpendicular to $CA$, the scalar products of the position vectors of the vertices satisfy:

$$a_xb_x+a_yb_y=a_xc_x+a_yc_y=b_xc_x+b_yc_y=k$$

for some constant $k$.

Consequently, the equations of the three side lines are:

$$\begin{aligned}
BC &: a_xx+a_yy=k,\\
CA &: b_xx+b_yy=k,\\
AB &: c_xx+c_yy=k.
\end{aligned}$$

The intersections of $BC$ with the coordinate axes are therefore $A_1=(k/a_x,0)$ and $A_2=(0,k/a_y)$. Their midpoint is:

$$A_0=\left(\frac{k}{2a_x},\frac{k}{2a_y}\right).$$

Similarly, the other two midpoints are:

$$\begin{aligned}
B_0&=\left(\frac{k}{2b_x},\frac{k}{2b_y}\right),\\
C_0&=\left(\frac{k}{2c_x},\frac{k}{2c_y}\right).
\end{aligned}$$

It remains to show that these three points are collinear.

Because $CH$ is perpendicular to $AB$,

$$c_x(a_x-b_x)+c_y(a_y-b_y)=0.$$

Hence the slope of the line $A_0B_0$ is:

$$\begin{aligned}
\frac{1/a_y-1/b_y}{1/a_x-1/b_x}
&=\frac{a_xb_x(b_y-a_y)}{a_yb_y(b_x-a_x)}\\
&=-\frac{a_xb_xc_x}{a_yb_yc_y}.
\end{aligned}$$

Likewise, using $BH\perp CA$, the slope of $A_0C_0$ is:

$$\frac{1/a_y-1/c_y}{1/a_x-1/c_x}
=-\frac{a_xc_xb_x}{a_yc_yb_y}.$$

The two slopes are equal, proving that $A_0$, $B_0$ and $C_0$ are collinear.

This calculation applies when the six intersections are finite and the triangle is not right-angled. For a right-angled triangle, the orthocenter is a vertex, and the two midpoints on the adjacent side lines coincide at that vertex, so collinearity follows immediately whenever the intersections are well-defined.

== Goormaghtigh's generalization ==
A generalization of the Droz-Farny line theorem was proved in 1930 by René Goormaghtigh.

As above, let $T$ be a triangle with vertices $A$, $B$, and $C$. Let $P$ be any point distinct from $A$, $B$, and $C$, and $L$ be any line through $P$. Let $A_1$, $B_1$, and $C_1$ be points on the side lines $BC$, $CA$, and $AB$, respectively, such that the lines $PA_1$, $PB_1$, and $PC_1$ are the images of the lines $PA$, $PB$, and $PC$, respectively, by reflection against the line $L$. Goormaghtigh's theorem then says that the points $A_1$, $B_1$, and $C_1$ are collinear.

The Droz-Farny line theorem is a special case of this result, when $P$ is the orthocenter of triangle $T$.

== Dao's generalization ==
The theorem was further generalized by Dao Thanh Oai. The generalization as follows:

First generalization: Let ABC be a triangle, P be a point on the plane, let three parallel segments AA', BB', CC' such that its midpoints and P are collinear. Then PA', PB', PC' meet BC, CA, AB respectively at three collinear points.

Dao's first generalization

Dao's second generalization

Second generalization: Let a conic S and a point P on the plane. Construct three lines d_{a}, d_{b}, d_{c} through P such that they meet the conic at A, A'; B, B' ; C, C' respectively. Let D be a point on the polar of point P with respect to (S) or D lies on the conic (S). Let DA' ∩ BC =A_{0}; DB' ∩ AC = B_{0}; DC' ∩ AB= C_{0}. Then A_{0}, B_{0}, C_{0} are collinear.
