= Josephine Chanler =

American mathematician

Josephine Hughes Chanler
- Born: April 7, 1906; St. Louis, Missouri
- Died: December 23, 1992 (aged 86); Urbana
- Occupation: Mathematician

Josephine Hughes Chanler (7 April 1906 – 23 December 1992) was an American mathematician specializing in algebraic geometry.

== Early life and education ==
She was born in St. Louis, Missouri. She was the only child of Louisa Castle and James Chanler. Her parents separated soon after her birth, and she grew up with her mother, who lived in Bowling Green, Kentucky and worked as a schoolteacher. As a girl she became ill with polio, and had to undergo treatment for it at intervals later in her life. When she was a high school student, she and her mother moved to Jacksonville, Florida, but they moved back to Bowling Green so that Chanler could attend the Western Kentucky State Normal School and Teacher's College. She completed a degree there in 1927, and became a high school teacher.

In 1929, Chanler and her mother moved again, to Illinois, so that Chanler could begin graduate studies at the University of Illinois at Urbana-Champaign. She earned a master's degree under the mentorship of Bessie Irving Miller, but Miller died soon afterward. She completed her doctorate there in 1933. Her dissertation, Poristic Double Binary Forms, was supervised by Arthur Byron Coble.

== Career ==
After completing her PhD, she joined the faculty at Illinois, and became an associate professor in 1944. Despite an offer to move to a college in New England, Chanler remained at Illinois for the rest of her career. She retired as an associate professor in 1971. After her retirement, she continued to tutor students.

== Personal life ==
Chanler lived with her mother until her mother's death in 1948.

Chanler was a Democrat, a member of Toastmasters International, and a member of St. Mary's Catholic Church. She listed her religion in about 1940 as Presbyterian, but she described herself in a 1983 conversation as "a Southern Presbyterian–Calvinist–Catholic with leanings toward Judaism and Islam and a very high regard for Buddhism, Mormons, and some Hindu gods".

Chanler died in Urbana, Illinois in 1992, having been in a health care facility for five years prior; she is buried there at Mount Hope Cemetery. She was remembered as "an excellent teacher and a person that everyone seemed to admire" by Annette Sinclair, who once took a summer course in classical algebraic geometry with Chanler.

== Legacy ==
The Josephine Chanler Scholarship for undergraduate students at UI was created in 2020 by Padmini Joshi.
