= Paul Mansion =

Belgian mathematician (1844–1919)

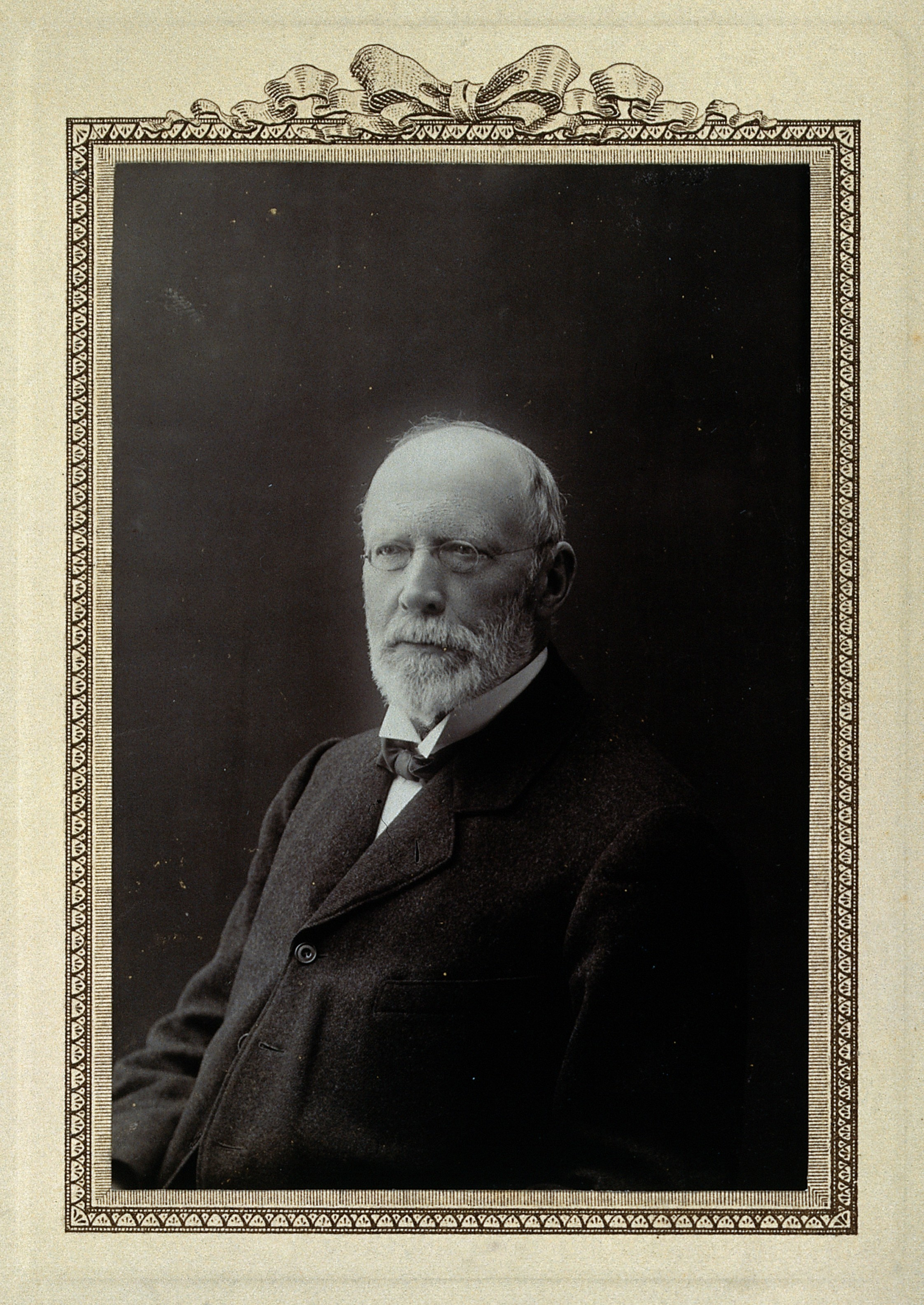
- Born: 3 June 1844; Marchin, near Huy, Belgium
- Died: 16 April 1919 (aged 74); Ghent, Belgium
- Education: University of Ghent
- Spouse: Marie-Cécile Belpaire
- Parent: Fernande Devreux
- Scientific career
- Fields: Mathematics
- Workplaces: University of Ghent
- Thesis: Théorie de la multiplication et de la transformation des fonctions elliptiques (1867)
- Doctoral advisor: Félix Dauge; Mathias Schaar
- Notable students: George Sarton

Paul Mansion (3 June 1844 – 16 April 1919) was a Belgian mathematician, editor of the journal Mathesis.

== Life and work ==
Mansion was the ninth of ten brothers. His father died when he was only a baby and he was brought up by his mother and his older brothers. He studied at Huy school and high school. In 1862 he entered in the École Normale des Sciences, attached to the University of Ghent, where he graduated in 1865. From this time till 1867 he taught mathematics in the artillery academy in Ghent, while he was working in his doctoral thesis. He was awarded PhD in 1867.

In 1867, after the death of his professor Mathias Schaar, he was appointed to the chair of calculus at the university of Ghent. He remained there until he was appointed to the chair of probability in 1892. Also, from 1884, he taught the history of mathematics.

In 1874, with Eugène Catalan, he founded the journal Nouvelle Correspondence Mathématique, and in 1880, with Joseph Neuberg, he founded the journal Mathesis.

The works of Mansion, deal mainly with non-Euclidean geometry, history of mathematics, and differential equations. He published 349 works in very different journals.

== Bibliography ==
- Demoulin, A. (1929). "La vie et l'oeuvre de Paul Mansion" (PDF). Annuaire (in French): 77–147.
- Walter, Scott (1999). "The non-euclidean style of Minkowskian relativity". In Jeremy Gray (ed.). The Symbolic Universe: Geometry and Physics 1890-1930. Oxford University Press. pp. 91–127. ISBN 978-0-19-850088-9.
- Pyenson, Lewis (1989). "What is the Good of History of Science?". History of Science. 27 (4): 353–389. doi:10.1177/007327538902700402. ISSN 0073-2753. PMID 11622212. S2CID 39613189.
