= Arnold Droz-Farny =

Swiss mathematician

- Born: 12 February 1856; La Chaux-de-Fonds, Switzerland
- Died: 14 January 1912 (aged 55); Porrentruy, Switzerland
- Education: LMU Munich
- Spouse: Lina Farny
- Parent(s): Édouard and Louise Droz
- Scientific career
- Fields: Mathematics
- Workplaces: Lycée Cantonal de Porrentruy

Arnold Droz-Farny (12 February 1856 – 14 January 1912) was a Swiss mathematician, professor in High School of Porrentruy (near Basel).

== Life and work ==
Arnold Droz changed his family name later in his life when he married Lisa Farny. He studied at the high school of Neuchâtel and then at the Technical School of Stuttgart and at the Ludwig-Maximilians-Universität München (LMU). After graduating in mathematics at LMU, he began to teach in a private school. In 1880, he was appointed to the chair of mathematics in the Lycée Cantonal of Porrentruy, where he remained till 1908 when ill health forced him to retire.

In mathematical world he is known by a theorem, the Droz-Farny line theorem, stated by him in 1899, without proof, in an answer to question 14111 in the journal The Educational Times.

Droz-Farny was also an amateur numismatic collector who published some articles on historical remarks of some coins and, upon his death donated his collection to the cantonal authorities.

== Bibliography ==
- Aymé, Jean Louis (2004). "A Purely Synthetic Proof of the Droz-Farny Line Theorem" (PDF). Forum Geometricorum. 4: 217–224. ISSN 1534-1178.
- Bahn, Joahnn Rudolf (1917). Anzeiger für schweizerische altertumskunde. Antiquarische Gesellschaft in Zürich.
- M., A. (1912). "Arnold Droz-Farny". Revue suisse de numismatique (in French). 18: 344–346. doi:10.5169/seals-172695. ISSN 0035-4163.
