= Joseph Jean Baptiste Neuberg =

Luxembourgish mathematician (1840–1926)

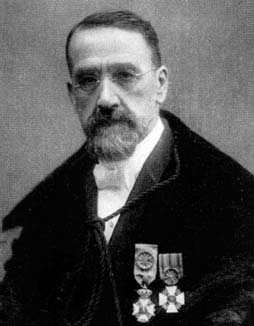
Joseph Jean Baptiste Neuberg

Joseph Jean Baptiste Neuberg (30 October 1840 – 22 March 1926) was a Luxembourgish mathematician who worked primarily in geometry.

== Biography ==
Neuberg was born on 30 October 1840 in Luxembourg City, Luxembourg. He first studied at a local school, the Athénée de Luxembourg, then progressed to Ghent University, studying at the École normale des Sciences of the science faculty. After graduation, Neuberg taught at several institutions. Between 1862 and 1865, he taught at the École Normale de Nivelle. For the next sixteen years, he taught at the Athénée Royal d'Arlon, though he also taught at the École Normale at Bruges from 1868 onwards.

Neuberg switched from his previous two schools to the Athénée Royal de Liège in 1878. He became an extraordinary professor in the university in the same city in 1884, and was promoted to ordinary professor in 1887. He held this latter position until his retirement in 1910. A year after his retirement, he was elected president of the Belgian Royal Academy, which he had joined earlier, in 1866, after taking Belgian nationality despite his origins.

The professor died on 22 March 1926 in Liège, Belgium, and was commemorated in the Bulletin of the American Mathematical Society.

== Contributions ==
Neuberg worked mainly in geometry, particularly the geometry of the triangle, The Neuberg cubic, a curve defined from a triangle, is named after him, and passes through the isodynamic points of a triangle which he discovered and published in 1885.

Neuberg was also involved in a number of mathematical journals. With Eugène Catalan and Paul Mansion, he founded the journal Nouvelle correspondance mathématique. This journal was founded to honour the earlier journal Correspondance mathématique et physique, which had been edited by Lambert Quetelet and Jean Garnier. Correspondance was published until 1880; after this, Catalan advised Mansion and Neuberg to continue publication of a new journal. They followed his advice, creating Mathesis in 1881, which is perhaps Neuberg's best-known journal.

Several mathematical societies included Neuberg: the Institute of Science of Luxembourg, the Royal Society of Science of Liège, Mathematical Society of Amsterdam, and the Belgian Royal Academy noted in the biography above.
