= Mathesis (journal) =

- Discipline: Mathematics
- Language: French

Publication details
- Former name(s): Nouvelle Correspondance Mathématique
- History: 1881

Standard abbreviations
- ISO 4: Mathesis

Mathesis: Recueil Mathématique was a Belgian scientific journal for elementary mathematics, established in 1881 by Paul Mansion and Joseph Jean Baptiste Neuberg.

An earlier Belgian mathematics journal, Nouvelle Correspondance Mathématique, was established in 1874 by Mansion and Neuberg together with Eugène Catalan. In 1880, Nouvelle Correspondance ceased publication, and Mansion and Neuberg together launched its successor, Mathesis, in 1881. Mathesis ceased publication in 1915 because of the war in Europe, but restarted again under the editorship of Neuberg and Adolphe Mineur in 1922 as the official journal of the Belgian Mathematical Society, which itself was founded in 1921. It continued in publication until 1965.
