= John Rogers Musselman =

American mathematician

John Rogers Musselman (1 December 1890, Gettysburg, Pennsylvania – 8 August 1968, Cleveland) was an American mathematician, specializing in algebraic geometry and known for Musselman's theorem.

J. R. Musselman received his A.B. in 1910 from Pennsylvania College and his Ph.D. from Johns Hopkins University in 1916 under Arthur Byron Coble with thesis A set of eight self-associated points in space. Musselman was a teaching assistant at Gettysburg Academy from 1910 to 1912 and an instructor in mathematics at the University of Illinois Urbana-Champaign in 1916–1918 and then at Washington University in St. Louis in 1920–1928. He was a professor of mathematics at Western Reserve University from 1928 until his retirement as professor emeritus in 1961.

He was an Invited Speaker of the International Congress of Mathematicians in 1936 in Oslo.

== Selected publications ==
- "Spurious Correlation Applied to Urn Schemata." Journal of the American Statistical Association 18, no. 143 (1923): 908–911.
- "On the linear correlation ratio in the case of certain symmetrical frequency distributions." Biometrika (1926): 228–231. doi:10.2307/2332505
- "On Circles Connected with Three and Four Lines." American Journal of Mathematics 59, no. 2 (1937): 371–375. JSTOR 2371420
- with Frank Morley: "On 2n points with a real cross-ratio." American Journal of Mathematics 59, no. 4 (1937): 787–792. doi:10.2307/2371346
- "On the line of images." American Mathematical Monthly 45, no. 7 (1938): 421–430. doi:10.2307/2304145
- "Some loci connected with a triangle." American Mathematical Monthly 47, no. 6 (1940): 354–361. doi:10.2307/2303632
