= Musalman =

Musalman may refer to:

- Mussulman, variant of an archaic term for "Muslim"
- The Musalman, newspaper
- Musalman (character) India's first Muslim superhero
- Musalman, 2001 film by Pakistan film director Iqbal Kashmiri
- Atahar Kamal Musalman
- Muhammad Okil Musalman
