= Andrew J. Musselman Jr. =

American judge and politician

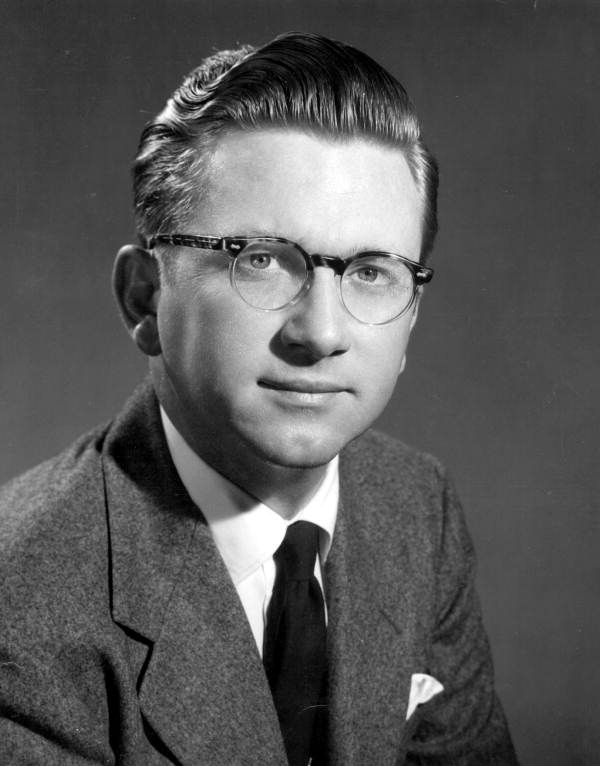
- Musselman in 1955

Member of the Florida House of Representatives from Broward County
- In office 1955–1957

Judge of the Broward Circuit Court
- In office 1986–1987
- In office 1988–1995

Personal details
- Born: Andrew Jackson Musselman Jr. November 8, 1926 Fort Lauderdale, Florida, U.S.
- Died: December 17, 1997 (aged 71) Pompano Beach, Florida, U.S.
- Party: Democratic
- Education: University of Nevada; University of Florida School of Law
- Occupation: Judge

Andrew Jackson Musselman Jr. (November 8, 1926 – December 17, 1997) was an American judge and politician. A member of the Democratic Party, he served in the Florida House of Representatives from 1955 to 1957 and as judge of the Broward Circuit Court from 1986 to 1987 and again from 1988 to 1995.

== Life and career ==
Musselman was born in Fort Lauderdale, Florida. He briefly attended the University of Miami on a football scholarship, before transferring to the University of Nevada, Reno, playing college football as a quarterback. He served in the United States Navy Reserve during World War II, which after his discharge, he attended the University of Florida School of Law, earning his law degree in 1950.

Musselman served in the Florida House of Representatives from 1955 to 1957. After his service in the House, Florida governor Bob Graham appointed Musselman to serve as judge of the Broward Circuit Court, serving from 1986 to 1987 and again from 1988 to 1995.

== Death ==
Musselman died on December 17, 1997, in Pompano Beach, Florida, at the age of 71.
