= Muscleman =

Any man with well-developed muscles

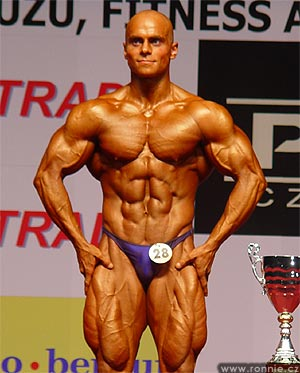
A bodybuilder, Jacob Allmendinger, posing onstage during a competition. The pose is a variation of the "most muscular".

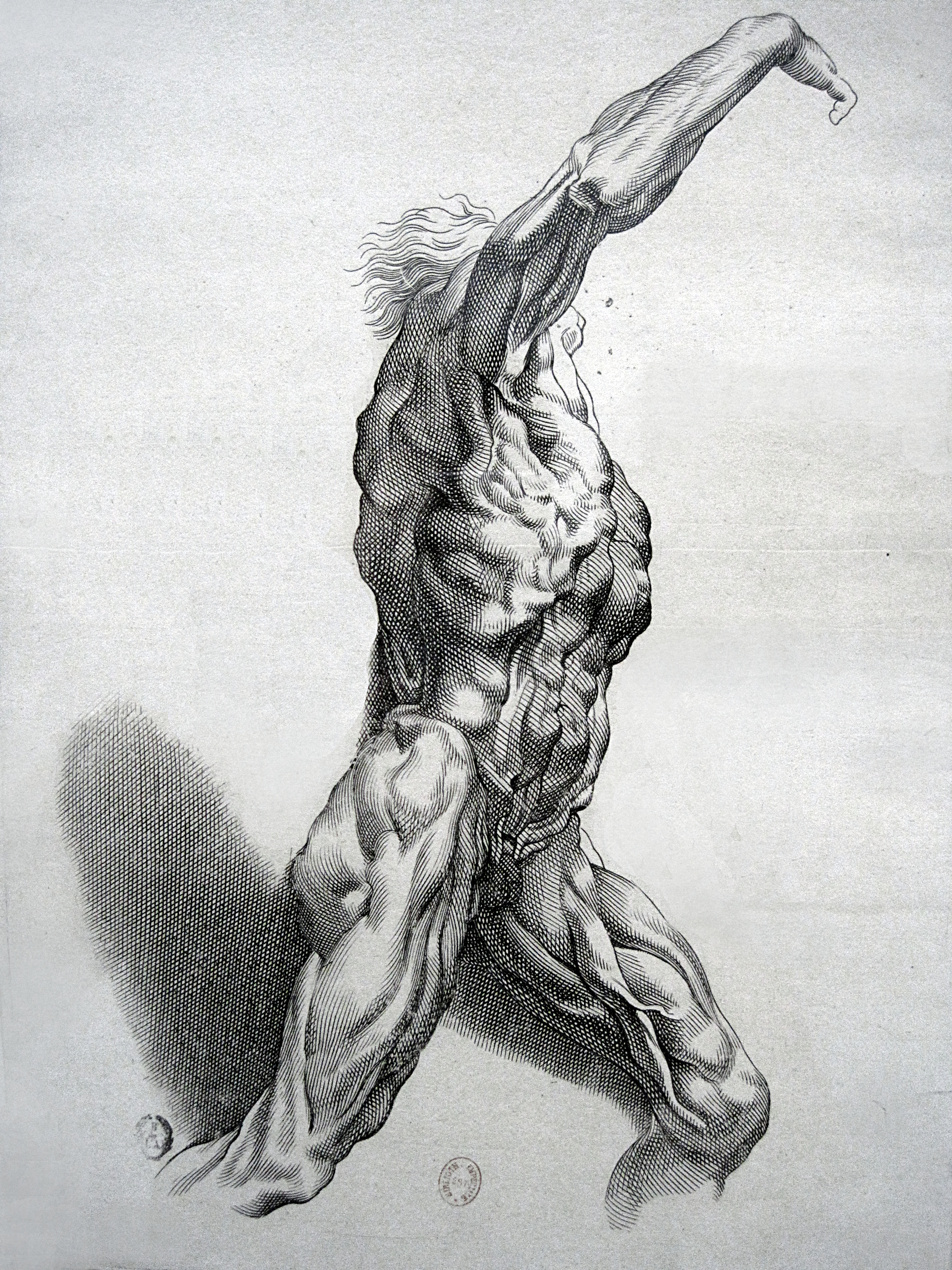
Écorché by Paulus Pontius.

Muscleman may denote any man with well-developed muscles, in particular a bodybuilder. In art-related and anatomical contexts, the term is also used for a model in wax (or, in modern times, of unbreakable plastic material) showing the muscles of a man. Such a figure showing the muscles of the human body without skin is also called écorché.

== In popular culture ==
Muscleman is the translated title of Japanese manga series Kinnikuman. M.U.S.C.L.E. was a line of related collectible toy figures produced in the U.S. from 1985 to 1988.
