= René Goormaghtigh =

Belgian engineer (1893–1960)

René Goormaghtigh (13 October 1893, Ostend – 10 February 1960, Ixelles) was a Belgian engineer, after whom the Goormaghtigh Conjecture is named.

Goormaghtigh studied at Ghent University, gaining a Diploma in Civil Engineering from the Central Board of Le Havre in 1918. Throughout his subsequent life he worked as an engineer and industrial administrator. In 1952 he was appointed advisor to the Société Générale de Belgique. He was made a Knight of the Order of Leopold II in 1947, and an Officer of the Order of the Crown in 1956. After a heart attack in 1958, he retired to Saint-André-des-Bruges.

He was a frequent contributor to mathematical journals, especially the Belgian journal Mathesis.
