= Coble surface =

In algebraic geometry, a Coble surface was defined by Dolgachev & Zhang (2001) to be a smooth rational projective surface with empty anti-canonical linear system |−K| and non-empty anti-bicanonical linear system |−2K|. An example of a Coble surface is the blowing up of the projective plane at the 10 nodes of a Coble curve.
