= Coble curve =

In algebraic geometry, a Coble curve is an irreducible degree-6 planar curve with 10 double points (some of them may be infinitely near points). They were studied by Arthur Coble (1919, 1982).

== See also ==
- Coble surface
