= Carnot =

Carnot may refer to:

== People ==
- Carnot Posey (1818–1863), American lawyer and military officer

=== People with the surname ===
- Lazare Carnot (1753–1823), French mathematician and politician of the French Revolution
- Louis Carnot (born 2001), French French footballer
- Nicolas Léonard Sadi Carnot (1796–1832), French military scientist and physicist; son of Lazare Carnot, namesake of Carnot Cycle.
- Hippolyte Carnot (1801–1888), French politician; son of Lazare Carnot
- Marie François Sadi Carnot (1837–1894), French politician; President of France from 1887 to 1894 and son of Hippolyte Carnot
- Marie-Adolphe Carnot (1839–1920), French mining engineer and chemist; son of Hippolyte Carnot
- Paul Carnot (1869–1957), French physician; son of Marie-Adolphe Carnot
- Stéphane Carnot (born 1972), former French footballer

== Places ==
- Carnot, Central African Republic, a city
- Carnot, Wisconsin, United States
- Carnot-Moon, Pennsylvania, United States

== Other uses ==
- Carnot cycle, in thermodynamics
- Carnot engine (intuitive explanation)
- Carnot heat engine, an idealised thermodynamic engine based on the Carnot cycle
- Carnot (crater), a crater on the far side of the Moon
- French battleship Carnot

== See also ==
- Carnot's theorem (disambiguation)
- Carnotite, a mineral
- Lycée Carnot, a school in Paris
- Karnaugh
