= Gallois =

Gallois as a French word means "Welsh".

It may refer to:

- Gallois (surname)
- Galeazzo Gegald (French: Gallois de Regard), Roman Catholic Bishop of Bagnoregio (1563–1568)
- SS Gallois, a French collier built in 1917

== See also ==
- Gaulois, French for a person of Gaul
- Gauloises, a brand of French cigarettes
