= Jean Garchery =

French politician (1872–1957)

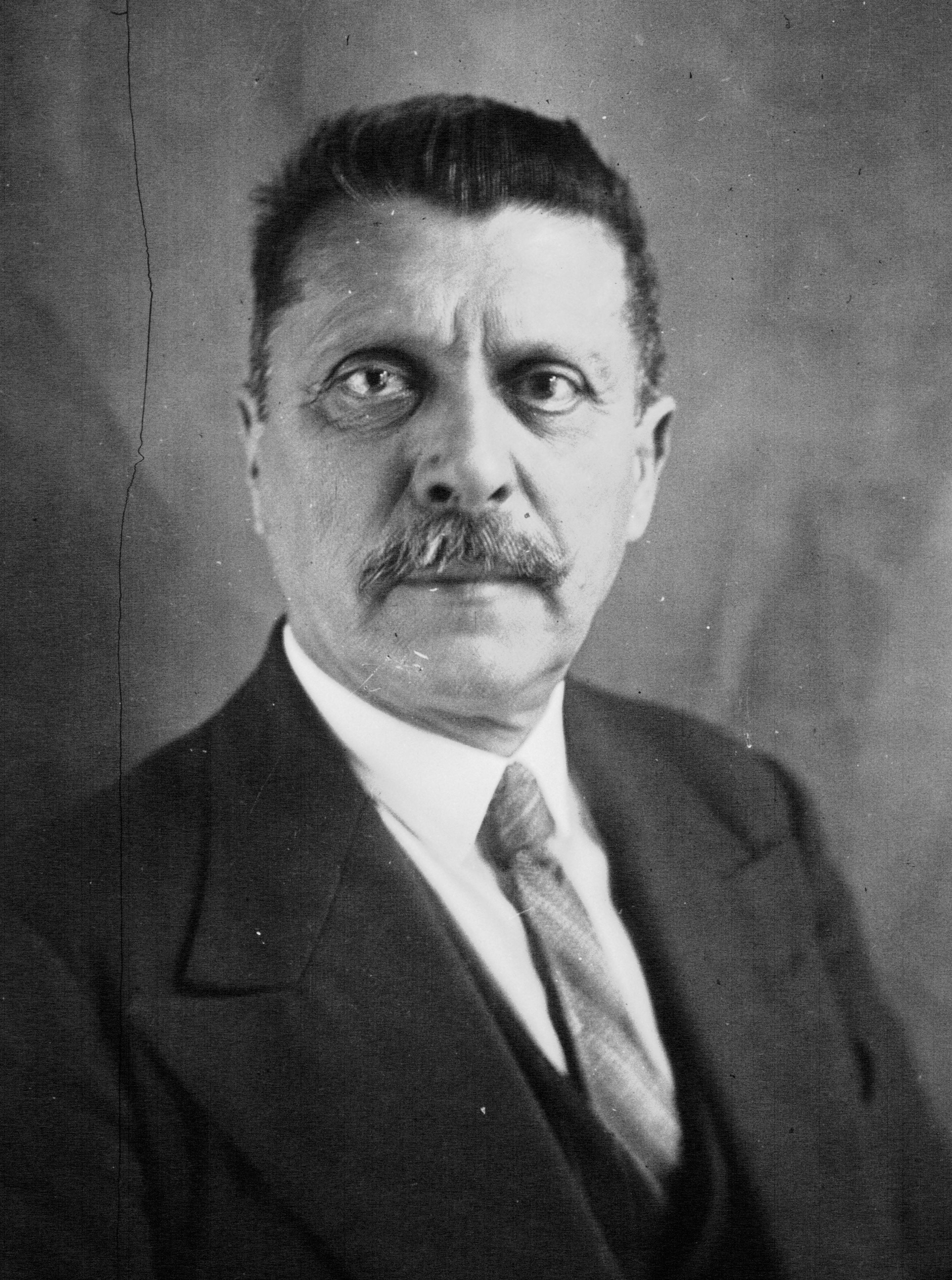
Jean Garchery

Jean Garchery (1 January 1872 in Nolay, Côte-d'Or – 12 February 1957 in Nice) was a French politician. At first he joined the Revolutionary Socialist Workers' Party (POSR), which in 1902 merged into the French Socialist Party (PSF), which in turn merged into the French Section of the Workers' International (SFIO) in 1905. Garchery joined the French Communist Party (PCF) upon its foundation in 1920 and represented the PCF in the Chamber of Deputies from 1924 to 1928. Having been excluded from the PCF in 1929, he was among the founders of the Workers and Peasants Party (POP), which in 1930 merged into the Proletarian Unity Party (PUP). In 1937 the PUP merged into the SFIO.

Garchery was a member of the Chamber of Deputies for a second time from 1932 to 1940. On 10 July 1940, he voted in favour of granting the Cabinet presided by Marshal Philippe Pétain authority to draw up a new constitution, thereby effectively ending the French Third Republic and establishing Vichy France. Mostly because of this vote, Garchery was excluded from the SFIO in November 1944, along with a number of other SFIO politicians. In 1945 he joined the newly founded Democratic Socialist Party (PSD).
