= Socialist-Communist Union =

The Socialist-Communist Union (French: Union socialiste-communiste, U.S.-C.), later renamed the Socialist-Communist Party (French: Parti socialiste-communiste), was a socialist political party in France between 1923 and 1932.

== Founding ==
The party was founded in Boulogne-sur-Seine on April 29, 1923, through the merger of two splinter groups of the French Communist Party; the Federal Socialist Union (formed in December 1922, formed by the Raoul Verfeuil-led rightist tendency of the Communist Party (which opposed the integration of the party into the Communist International) and L-O Frossard's United Communist Party. Frossard had been the First Secretary of the Communist Party but left the party and founded the United Communist Party on January 2, 1923, taking with him several intellectuals and municipal councillors (especially from the Paris region).

The mayors of the Parisian suburbs of Boulogne-sur-Seine, Issy, Saint-Denis, Saint-Ouen, Le Pré-Saint-Gervais and Pantin belonged to the party. Prominent members of the party included Georges Pioch, Victor Méric and Ernest Lafont.

== Crisis ==
U.S.-C. suffered a major setback Frossard and other prominent members (such as Henri Sellier) returned to the French Section of the Workers' International (SFIO) in 1924. Both U.S.-C. parliamentarians rejoined SFIO.

The remaining U.S.-C. had around 1,000 members. The party got around 10,000 votes in the 1928 French National Assembly election, and a candidate of the party (Ernest Lafont) was elected. Before the election the senator André Morizet and his followers had deserted the party.

The party was renamed 'Socialist-Communist Party' in 1927. In 1932 the party merged with Workers and Peasants Party, forming the Party of Proletarian Unity.

== International linkages ==
In July 1923 a meeting was held in Frankfurt, Germany, attended by the U.S.-C., Georg Ledebour's Socialist League from Germany, the Russian Left Socialist-Revolutionaries and the General Jewish Labour Bund. The meeting decided to set up a joint Information Bureau. The first meeting of the International Bureau of Revolutionary Socialist Parties (the 'Paris Bureau') was held in Berlin in December 1924, in which the U.S.-C. participated.

== Press ==
The party published L'Egalité (started by Frossard's group in January 1923) until April 1924. L'Egalité was a six-page biweekly newspaper. The publishing of L'Egalité was suspended after the crisis in the party that followed the return of Frossard and other prominent members to SFIO. The party launched Bulletin de l'Union Socialiste-Communiste in June 1924. In March 1926 this publication was renamed L'Unité ouvrière. This newspaper was published until December 1931.

In Loire, the party published Le Peuple de la Loire.
