= Lazare Carnot =

French politician, engineer and mathematician (1753–1823)

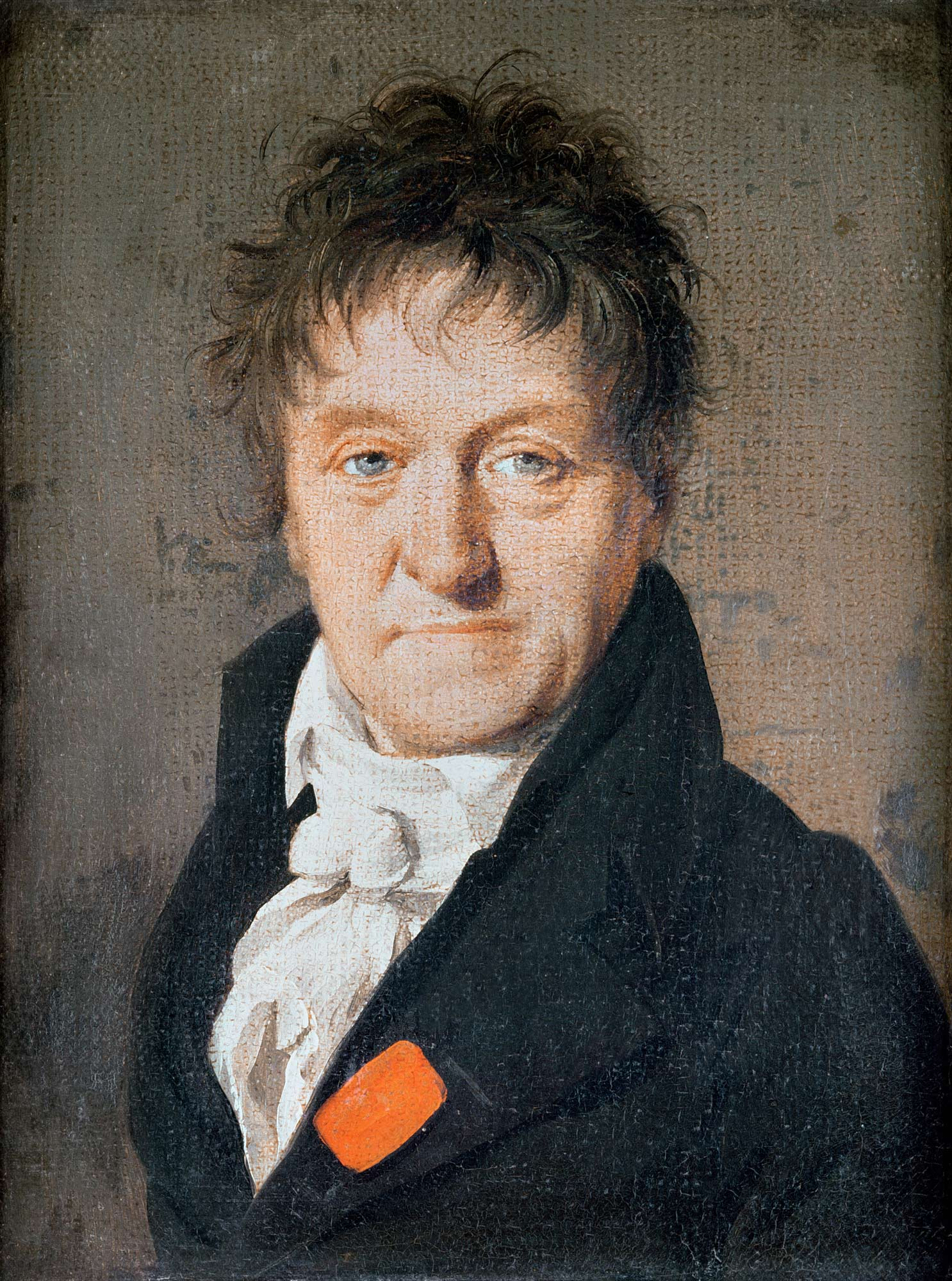
- Portrait by Louis-Léopold Boilly, 1813

Minister of Interior
- In office 20 March – 22 June 1815
- Monarch: Napoleon I
- Preceded by: François-Xavier-Marc-Antoine de Montesquiou-Fézensac
- Succeeded by: Claude Carnot-Feulin

Minister of War
- In office 2 April – 8 October 1800
- Preceded by: Louis-Alexandre Berthier
- Succeeded by: Louis-Alexandre Berthier

Director of the Directory
- In office 4 November 1795 – 5 September 1797
- Preceded by: Vacant
- Succeeded by: Philippe-Antoine Merlin de Douai

Member of the Committee of Public Safety
- In office 14 August 1793 – 6 October 1794

42nd President of the National Convention
- In office 20 May – 4 June 1794
- Preceded by: Robert Lindet
- Succeeded by: Claude-Antoine Prieur-Duvernois

Personal details
- Born: 13 May 1753 Nolay, Burgundy, Kingdom of France
- Died: 2 August 1823 (aged 70) Magdeburg, Saxony, Kingdom of Prussia
- Resting place: Panthéon, Paris
- Party: Marais
- Children: Sadi Carnot; Lazare Hippolyte Carnot
- Occupation: Mathematician; engineer; politician

Military service
- Allegiance: Kingdom of France; Kingdom of the French; First French Republic; First French Empire
- Branch/service: Army
- Years of service: 1771–1815
- Rank: Divisional general

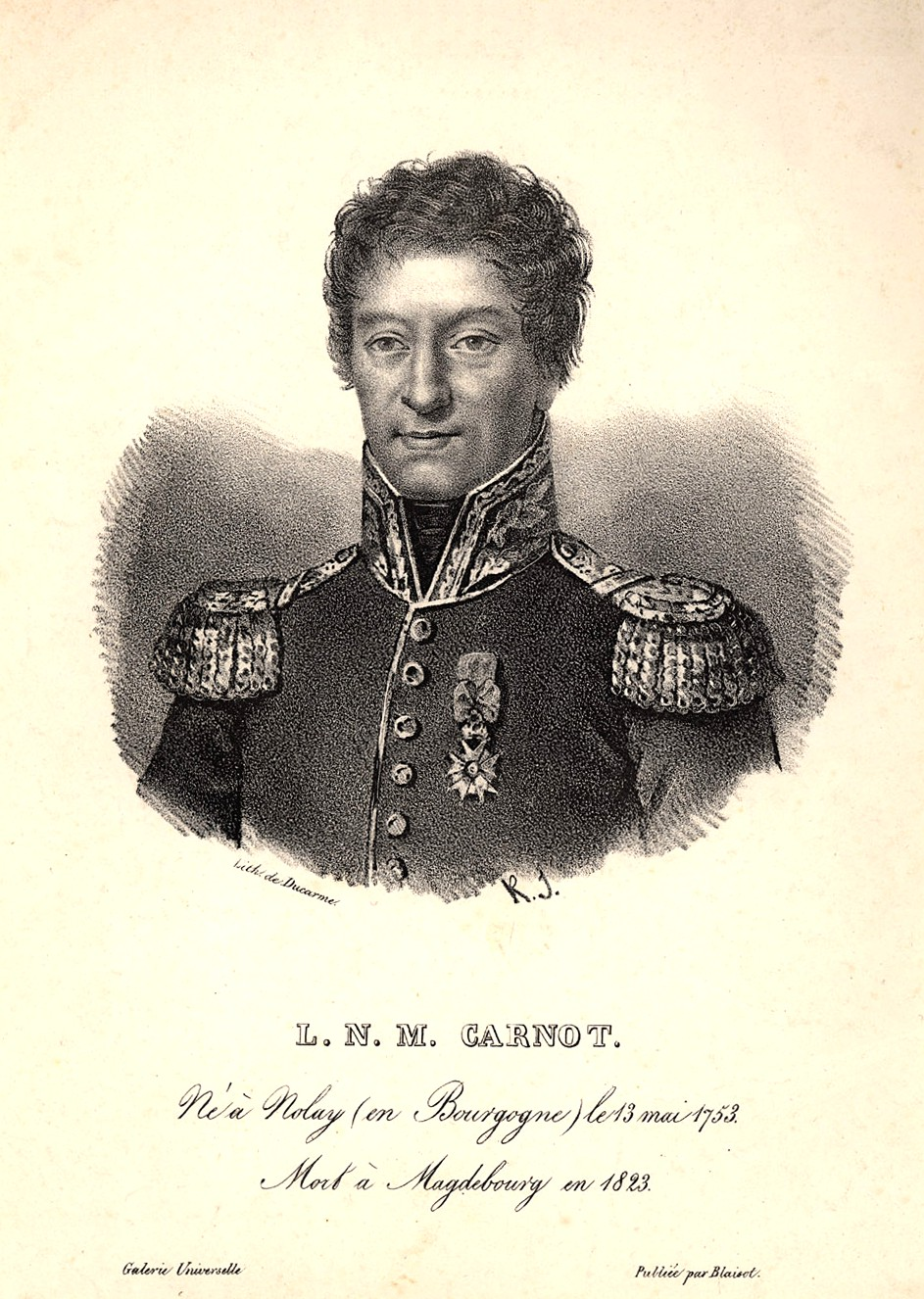

Lazare Nicolas Marguerite, Comte Carnot (English: /kɑːrˈnoʊ/ kar-NOH, French: [lazaʁ nikɔla maʁɡəʁit kaʁno]; 13 May 1753 – 2 August 1823) was a French mathematician, physicist, military officer, politician and a leading member of the Committee of Public Safety during the French Revolution. His military reforms, which included the introduction of mass conscription (levée en masse), were instrumental in transforming the French Revolutionary Army into an effective fighting force.

Carnot was elected to the National Convention in 1792, and a year later he became a member of the Committee of Public Safety, where he directed the French war effort as one of the Ministers of War during the War of the First Coalition. He oversaw the reorganization of the army, imposed discipline, and significantly expanded the French force through the imposition of mass conscription. Credited with France's renewed military success from 1793 to 1794, Carnot came to be known as the "Organizer of Victory".

Increasingly disillusioned with the radical politics of the Montagnards, Carnot broke with Maximilien Robespierre and played a role in the latter's overthrow on 9 Thermidor and subsequent execution. He became one of the five initial members of the Directory but was ousted after the Coup of 18 Fructidor in 1797 and went into exile.

Following Napoleon's rise to power, Carnot returned to France and in 1800 was briefly Minister of War. A fervent Republican, he chose to withdraw from public life after Napoleon's coronation as Emperor. In 1812, he returned to serve under Napoleon and oversaw the defense of Antwerp against the Sixth Coalition, and during the Hundred Days he was Napoleon's Minister of the Interior. Carnot was exiled after the second Bourbon Restoration and died in Magdeburg, Prussia in 1823.

In addition to his political career, Carnot was also an eminent mathematician. His 1803 Géométrie de position is considered a pioneering work in the field of projective geometry. He is also remembered for developing the Carnot wall, a system of fortification that became widely employed in continental Europe during the 19th century.

== Education and early life ==
Carnot was born on 13 May 1753 in the village of Nolay, in Burgundy, as the son of a local judge and royal notary, Claude Carnot and his wife, Marguerite Pothier. He was the second oldest of seven children. At the age of fourteen, Lazare and his brother were enrolled at the Collège d'Autun, where he focused on the study of philosophy and the classics. He held a strong belief in stoic philosophy and was deeply influenced by Roman civilization. When he turned fifteen, he left school in Autun to strengthen his philosophical knowledge and study under the Society of the Priests of Saint Sulpice. During his short time with them, he studied logic, mathematics and theology under the Abbé Bison.

Impressed with Lazare's work as a scholar, the duc d'Aumont (Marquis de Nolay) recommended a military career for the youngster. Carnot was soon sent by his father to the Aumont residence to further his education. Here, he was enrolled in M. de Longpré's pension school in 1770 until he was ready to enter one of two prestigious engineering and artillery schools in Paris. A year later, in February 1771, he was ranked the third highest among twelve who were chosen out of his class of more than one hundred who took the entrance exams. It was at this point when he entered the École royale du génie de Mézières, appointed as a second lieutenant. Studies at the Mézières included geometry, mechanics, geometrical designing, geography, hydraulics and material preparation. On 1 January 1773 he graduated the school, ranked as a first lieutenant. He was eighteen years old.

Carnot obtained a commission as a lieutenant in Louis Joseph, Prince of Condé's engineer corps. At this moment, he made a name for himself both in the line of (physics) theoretical engineering and in his work in the field of fortifications. While in the army, stationed in Calais, Cherbourg and Béthune, he continued his study of mathematics. In December 1783, he received a promotion to the rank of captain.

In 1784 he published his first work Essay on Machines, which contained a statement that foreshadowed the principle of energy as applied to a falling weight, and the earliest proof that kinetic energy is lost in the collision of imperfectly elastic bodies. This publication earned him the honor of the Académie des Sciences, Arts et Belles-Lettres de Dijon. Another turning point was his essay on Vauban in which he praised the engineer on his works while at the same time developing his own career as a writer/engineer. Vauban's work had a profound effect on his work as a general and engineer. In 1786 he became acquainted with Robespierre, a lawyer in Arras, in the local literary club. In 1788 he returned to Béthune, where he was imprisoned with a lettre de cachet, because of a broken promise to marry a woman from Dijon. After his release he was stationed in Aire-sur-la-Lys and married Sophie Dupont from Saint-Omer in May 1791. For two months he served as president of the local literary society.

== Political career ==
In September 1791 he became a delegate for Pas-de-Calais to the Legislature. While a member of the Legislative Assembly, Carnot was elected to the Committee of Public Instruction. He believed that all citizens should be educated. As a member of that committee, he wrote a series of reforms for the teaching and educational systems, but they were not implemented due to the violent social and economic climate of the Revolution.

After the Legislative Assembly was dissolved, Carnot was elected to the National Convention in September 1792. He spent the last few months of 1792 on a mission to Bayonne, organizing the military defense effort in an attempt to ward off any possible attacks from Spain. Upon returning to Paris, Carnot voted for the death of Louis XVI, although he had been absent for the debates surrounding his trial. By mid-February Carnot proposed that annexation be undertaken on behalf of French interests whether or not the people to be annexed so wished. Following the king's veto of the Assembly's efforts to suppress nonjuring priests on 27 May, on a proposal of Carnot and Servan in the Assembly to raise a permanent militia of volunteers on 8 June, and the reinstatement of Brissotin ministers dismissed on 18 June, the monarchy faced an abortive demonstration of 20 June.

On 14 August 1793 Carnot was elected to the Committee of Public Safety, where he took charge of the military situation as one of the Ministers of War. He was friendly with Johan Valckenaer who tried to hasten the invasion of the Dutch Republic.

With the establishment of the Directory in 1795, Carnot became one of the five initial directors. For the first year, the Directors did well working harmoniously together as well as with the Councils. However, difference of political views led to a schism between Carnot and Étienne-François Letourneur, followed by François de Barthélemy, on the one side, and the triumvirate of Paul François Jean Nicolas, vicomte de Barras, Jean-François Rewbell and Louis Marie de La Révellière-Lépeaux on the other side. Carnot and Barthélemy supported concessions to end the war, and hoped to oust the triumvirate and replace them with more conservative men. After Letourneur had been replaced by another close collaborator of Carnot, François de Barthélemy, both of them, alongside many deputies in the Council of Five Hundred, were ousted in the Coup of 18 Fructidor (4 September 1797), engineered by Generals Napoleon Bonaparte (originally, Carnot's protégé) and Charles-Pierre Augereau. Carnot took refuge in Geneva, and there in 1797 issued his La métaphysique du calcul infinitésimal.

=== Military accomplishments ===
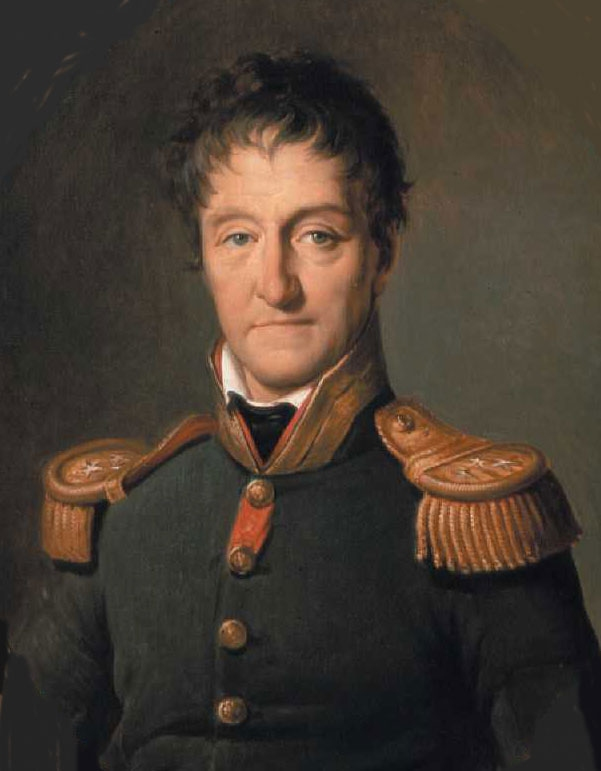
Lazare Carnot, a feverishly productive member of the Committee of Public Safety during the Reign of Terror. His part in raising the levée en masse probably saved the French Revolutionary armies from defeat at the hands of their numerically superior opponents.

The creation of the French Revolutionary Army was largely due to his powers of organization and enforcing discipline. In order to raise more troops for the war, Carnot introduced conscription: the levée en masse approved by the National Convention was able to raise France's army from 645,000 troops in mid-1793 to 1.5 million in September 1794. He was the first to execute the modern waging of war with mass armies and strategic planning realized by the Revolution. As a military engineer, Carnot favored fortresses and defensive strategies. He developed innovative defensive designs for forts, including the Carnot wall, named after him. However, with the constant invasions he decided to take his strategic planning to an offensive strike. From his intellect sprang the maneuvers and organization that turned the tides of war from 1793 to 1794.

The basic idea was to have a massive army separated into several units that could move more quickly than the enemy and attack from the flanks rather than head on, which had led to resounding defeats before Carnot was elected to the Committee of Public Safety. This tactic was extremely successful against the more traditional tactics of existing European armies. It was his initiative to train the conscripts in the art of war and to place new recruits with experienced soldiers rather than having a massive volunteer army without any real idea of how to wage battle.

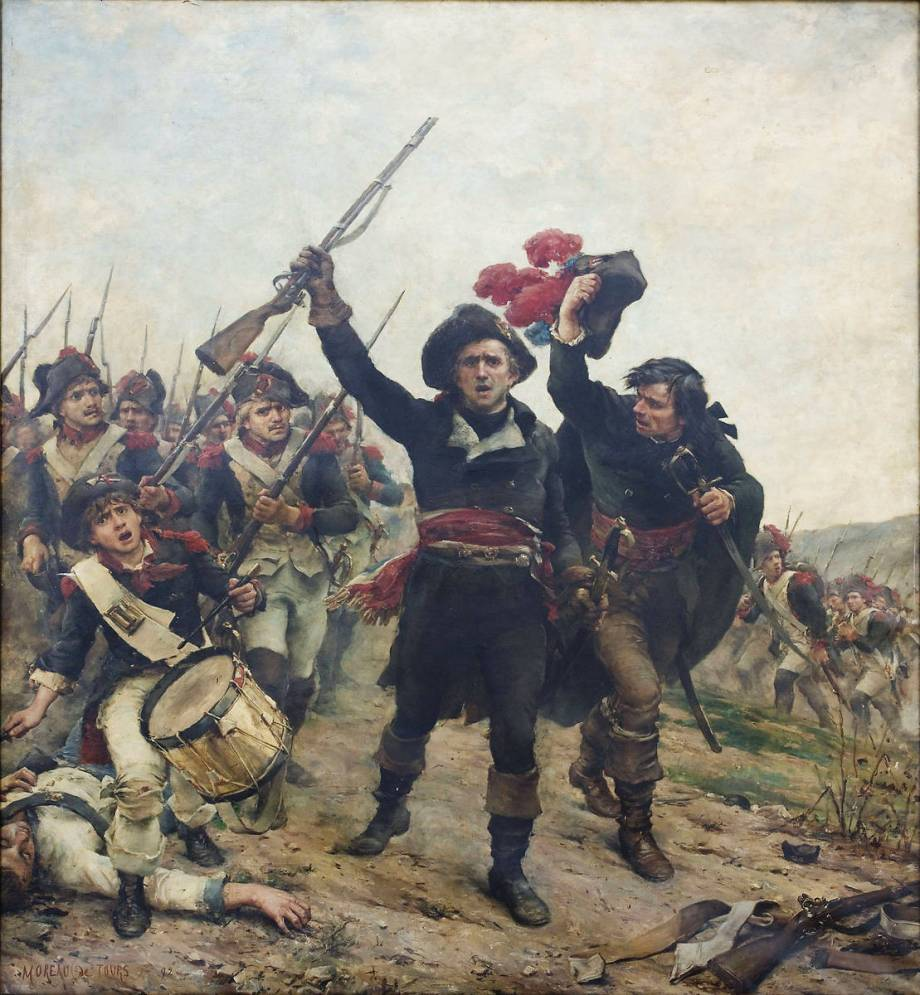
An 1893 depiction by Georges Moreau de Tours of Carnot at the Battle of Wattignies a century earlier

Once the problem of troop numbers had been solved, Carnot turned his administrative skills to the supplies that this massive army would need. Many of the munitions and supplies were in short supply: copper was lacking for guns so he ordered church bells seized in order to melt them down; saltpeter was lacking and he called chemistry to his aid; leather for boots was scarce so he demanded and secured new methods for tanning. He quickly organized the army and helped to turn the tide of the war. It added significantly to discontent with the course of the Revolution in still Bourbon-loyalist areas—such as the Vendée, which had broken out in open revolt five months earlier—but the government of the time considered it a success, and Carnot became known as the Organizer of Victory. In autumn 1793, he took charge of French columns on the Northern Front, and contributed to Jean-Baptiste Jourdan's victory in the Battle of Wattignies.

==== Relationship with Maximilien Robespierre and the Jacobin Club ====
Carnot met Robespierre for the first time in Arras where he was assigned for military duty and shortly after Robespierre finished his legal studies. Both of them were members of the literary club, and they sang Societe des Rosati together. The group was founded in 1778 and was inspired by the works of Chapelle, La Fontaine and Chaulieu. It was here where they became acquaintances and eventually friends. Robespierre preceded Carnot into the Academy of Arras entering in April 1784 while he entered in 1786.

While they were active members of the Committee of Public Safety in 1794, tensions between Carnot and Robespierre began to rise massively. During his time on the committee, which was heavily radical, Carnot signed a total of 43 decrees and drafted 18 of them. Most of them dealt with military tactics and education. Despite leaning on Jacobin beliefs, Carnot was considered the "conservative" of his half. He was not an official member of the radical group and therefore took on his own independent beliefs in regards to many issues. One of these issues included Robespierre's proposal on an egalitarian social system with which Carnot feverishly disagreed.

Although he had taken no steps to oppose the Reign of Terror, he and some other technocrats on the committees, including Robert Lindet and Louis-Bernard Guyton de Morveau, turned on Maximilien Robespierre and his allies during the Thermidorian Reaction by having him arrested. Robespierre was later killed along with 21 of his followers. Shortly after Robespierre's fall, Carnot was charged for his role during the time but the charges were quickly dismissed when he became a member of the Directory.

==== Relationship with Napoleon Bonaparte ====
In 1795, Carnot appointed Napoleon Bonaparte as general in chief of the Army of Italy. He is known to be the only member of the Directory to have supported Napoleon during this time.

In 1800 Bonaparte appointed Carnot as Minister of War, and he served in that office at the time of the Battle of Marengo. In 1802 he voted against the establishment of Napoleon's Consular powers for life and the passing of the title to his children, for as Carnot said when speaking of the power necessary to govern a state "If this power is the appendage of a hereditary family it becomes despotic."

After Napoleon crowned himself emperor on 2 December 1804, Carnot's republican convictions precluded his acceptance of high office under the First French Empire, and he resigned from public life. Probably in response to the fall of the fortress of Vlissingen to the British during the Walcheren Campaign in 1809, Napoleon employed Carnot to write a treatise describing how fortifications could be improved, for the use of the École militaire de Metz. Building on the theories of the controversial engineer Montalembert, Carnot advanced ideas on how the long-established bastioned system of fortification could be modified for close defense and to allow for counter attack by the besieged garrison.

In 1812, Carnot returned to office in defense of Napoleon during the disastrous invasion of Russia and was assigned the defense of Antwerp against the Sixth Coalition. He surrendered only at the demand of the Count of Artois, the younger brother of Louis XVIII who later reigned as Charles X. He was later made a Count of the Empire by Napoleon as Lazare Nicolas Marguerite, Comte Carnot. During the Hundred Days, Carnot served as Minister of the Interior for Napoleon, and was exiled as a regicide during the White Terror after the Second Restoration during the reign of Louis XVIII.

== Retirement and legacy ==
In 1803 Carnot produced his Géométrie de position. This work deals with projective rather than descriptive geometry. Carnot is responsible for initiating the use of cross-ratios: "He was the first to introduce the cross (anharmonic) ratio of four points of a line taking account of its sign, thereby sharpening Pappus's concept. He then proved that this ratio is invariant for the four points obtained by cutting four lines of a pencil of lines with different secants. In this way, he established the harmonic properties of the complete quadrilateral." This approach to geometry was used by Karl von Staudt four decades later to set a new foundation to mathematics.

The Borda–Carnot equation in fluid dynamics and several theorems in geometry are named after him: one that describes a property of the incircle and the circumcircle of a triangle, one that describes a relation between triangles and conic sections and one that describes a property of certain perpendiculars on triangle sides.

Published in 1810 under the title "Traité de la Défense des Places Fortes", his ideas on fortification were further developed in the third edition which was published in 1812. An English translation, "A Treatise on the Defence of Fortified Places" was published in 1814. Although few of his proposals were accepted by mainstream engineers, the Carnot wall, a detached wall at the foot of the escarp, became a common feature in fortifications built in the mid-19th century.

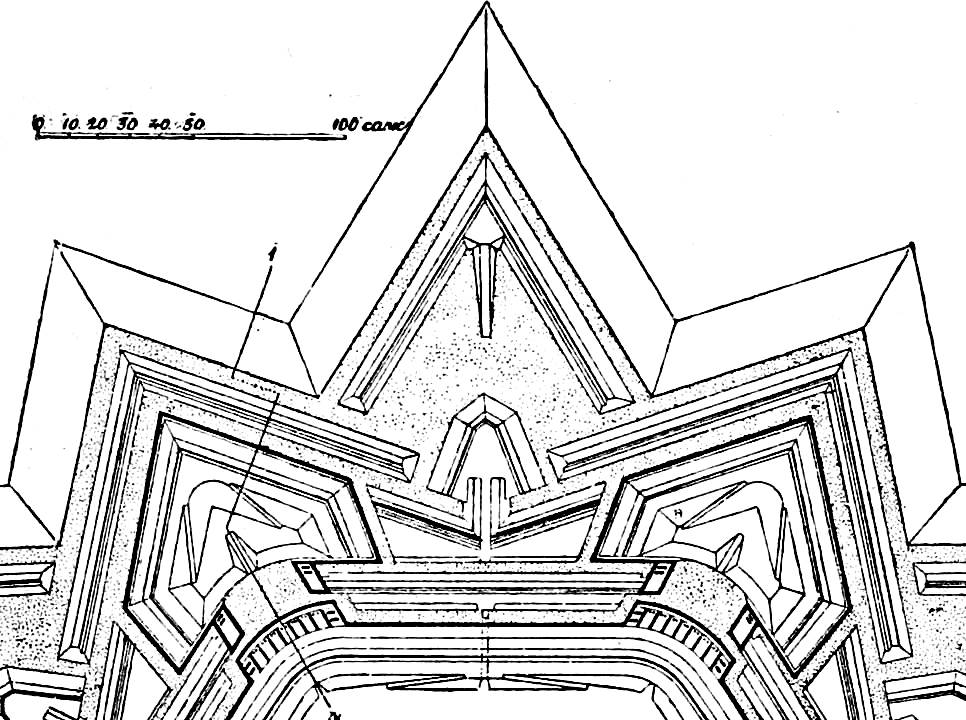
A textbook illustration of Carnot's system of bastion fortification.

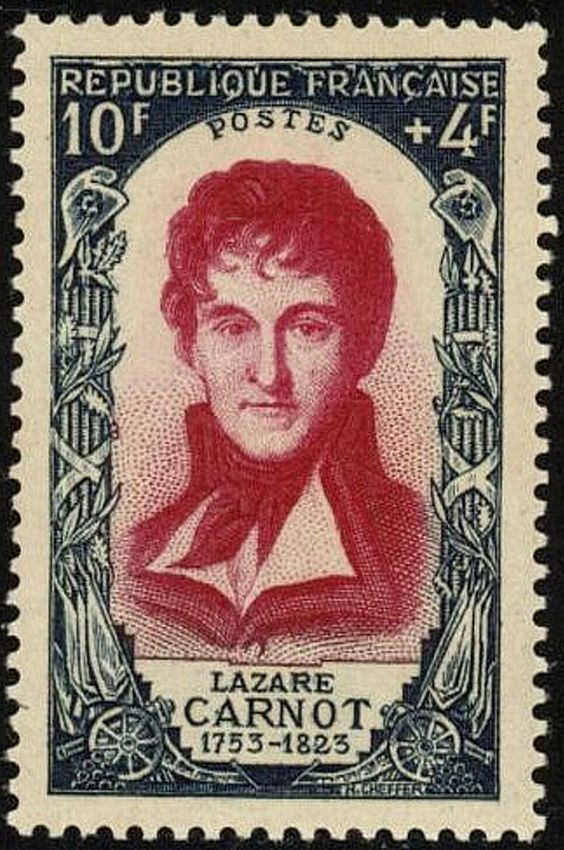
The French Post Office issued a memorial postage stamp in honor of Carnot in 1948

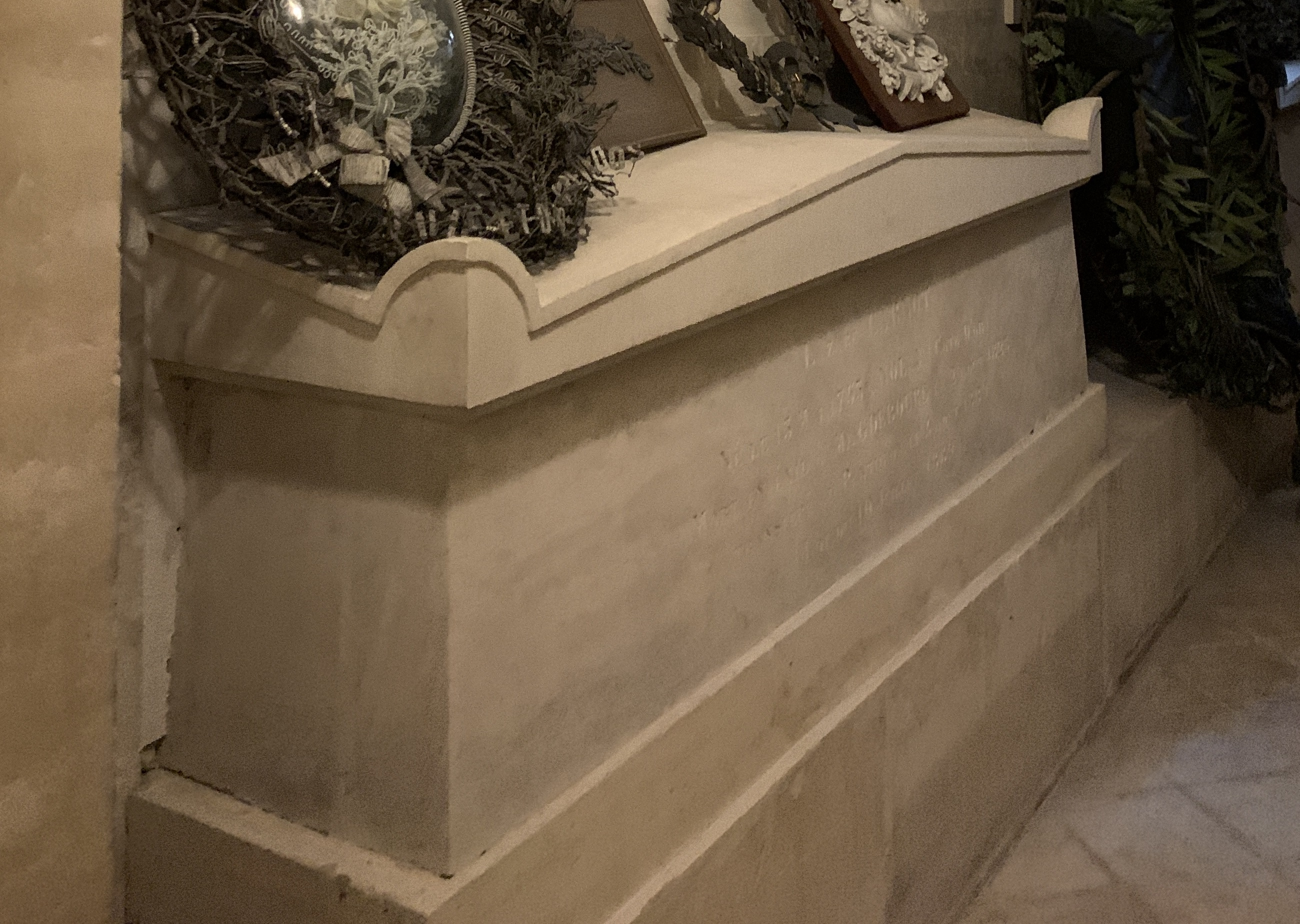
Tomb of Lazare Carnot in the Panthéon, Paris

He lived in Warsaw, Congress Poland, and then moved to the Kingdom of Prussia, where he died in the city of Magdeburg. Carnot's remains were interred at the Panthéon in 1889, at the same time as those of Théophile Corret de la Tour d'Auvergne, Jean-Baptiste Baudin and François Séverin Marceau-Desgraviers.

Carnot survived all the phases of the French Revolution, from its beginnings in 1789 until the fall of Napoleon in 1815. On the social and political front, Carnot was the author of many reforms sought to improve the country. One of these was the proposal for compulsory public education for all citizens. He also penned a proposal for the new Constitution which included the "Declaration of the Duties of the Citizens" that held that there should be not only education but military service for all citizens of France between the ages of twenty and twenty-five.

== Work in mathematics and theoretical engineering ==
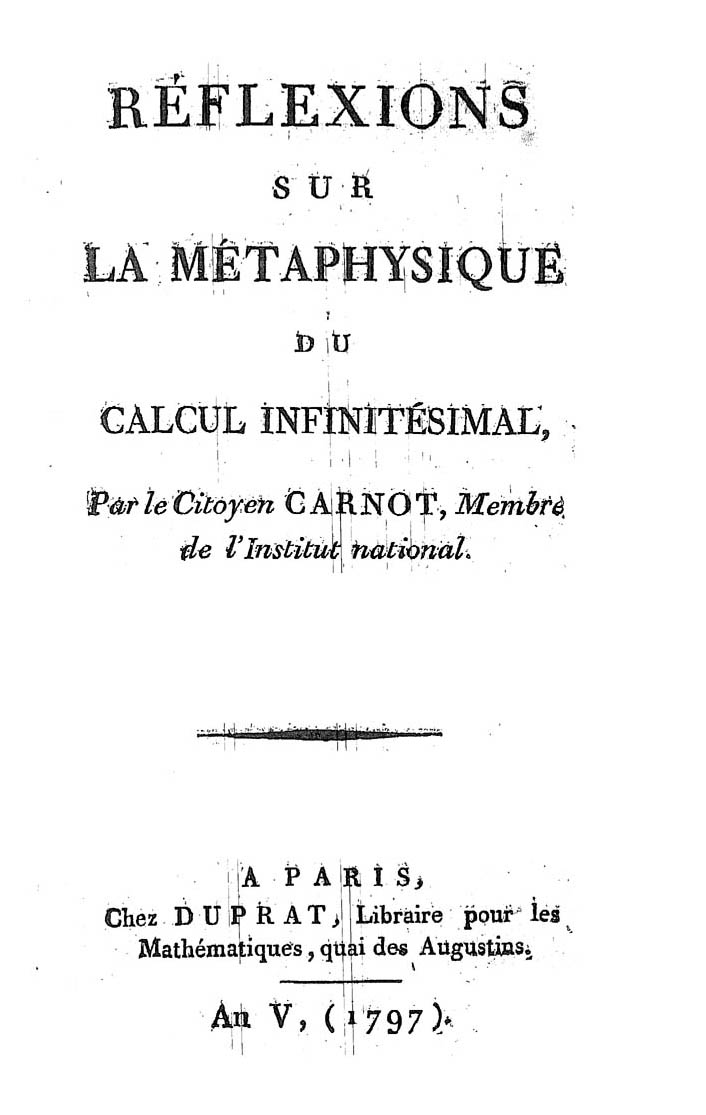
Réflexions sur la métaphysique du calcul infinitésimal, 1797

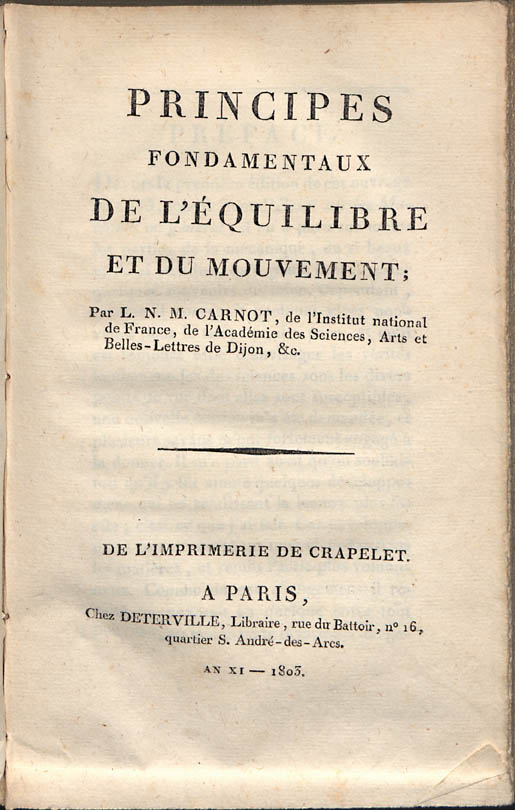
Principes fondamentaux de l'équilibre et du mouvement, 1803

- 1801: De la Corrélation des Figures de Géométrie, containing several theorems in geometry now known as Carnot's theorem
- Principes fondamentaux de l'équilibre et du mouvement (in French). Paris: Jean-François-Pierre Deterville. 1803.
- 1832: Reflexions on the Metaphysical Principles of the Infinitesimal Analysis

He also published essays about engineering theory. Essai sur les machines en général won honorable mention from the Academie sur Science of Paris in 1780. It was revised and published in 1783. In this he outlined a mathematical theory of power transmission in mechanical systems. His essay Principes fondamentaux de l'équilibre et du mouvement 1803 was a further revision and expansion of the earlier work.

Carnot's son, Sadi, was influenced by his father's work when he undertook his research into the thermal efficiency of steam engines.

Carnot's name is one of the 72 names inscribed on the Eiffel Tower.

== Famous offspring ==
- His son Sadi Carnot was a founder of the field of thermodynamics and the theory of heat engines (see Carnot cycle).
- His second son Lazare Hippolyte Carnot was a French statesman.
- His grandson Marie François Sadi Carnot (son of Hippolyte) was President of the French Republic from 1887 until his assassination in 1894.

== Bibliography ==
- 1796 – Exploits des Français depuis le 22 Fructidor an 1, jusqu'au 15 Pluviose an III, 8 sept. 1793 - 3 febr. 1795
- 1798 – Réponse de L.N.M. Carnot ... au rapport fait sur la conjuration du 18 fructidor, au conseil des cinq-cents
- 1799 – Second memoire de Carnot
- 1810 – De la défense des places fortes, ouvrage composé par ordre de Sa Majesté impériale et royale pour l'instruction des élèves du corps du Génie
- 1814 – Mémoire adressé au roi, en juillet 1814
- 1814 – (translated by Baron de Montalembert) A Treatise on the Defence of Fortified Places
- 1823 – Mémoire sur la fortification primitive : pour servir de suite au Traité de la défense des places fortes
- 1888 – Carnot : d'après les archives nationales, le dépot de la guerre et les séances de la convention
- 1892–1897 – Correspondance générale de Carnot. Publiee avec des notes historiques et biographiques. Tome I. Aout 1792 - Mars 1793; Tome II. Mars - Aout 1793; Tome III. Aout - Octobre 1793

== Notes ==
Political offices
Preceded by Louis Alexandre Berthier	Minister of War; 2 April 1800 – 8 October 1800	Succeeded by Louis Alexandre Berthier
Preceded by François Xavier de Montesquiou-Fezensac	Minister of Interior; 20 March 1815 – 22 June 1815	Succeeded by Claude Carnot-Feulin
