= Louis-Anne La Virotte =

French physician and encyclopédiste

Louis-Anne La Virotte (15 July 1725, in Nolay, Province of Burgundy – 3 March 1759, in Paris) was an 18th-century French physician and encyclopédiste.

== Biography ==
He first studied medicine at the Université de Montpellier. He then moved to the French capital and was introduced to the Journal des sçavans through the protection of Chancellor Henri François d'Aguesseau.

He was appointed to the position of docteur régent at the Faculté de médecine de Paris where he was for many years one of the eighteen royal censors for natural history, medicine, and chemistry. At the beginning of the Seven Years' War in 1757, he joined the army of Westphalia. In the following years, he practised at the Hôpital de la Charité in Paris. Melchior Grimm wrote: "He joined a lot of knowledge and literature, a strong and pleasant spirit and all the qualities of a good man".

He wrote the article Docteur en médecine for the Encyclopédie by Denis Diderot and Jean le Rond d’Alembert.

== Works (selection) ==
- 1749: Découvertes philosophiques de Newton de Maclaurin. (translated from English)
- 1750: Nоuvelles Observations Microscopiques de Needham (translated from English)
- 1757: Observations sur une Hydrophobie spontanée, suivie de la rage.

== Bibliography ==
- Ferdinand Hoefer: Nouvelle Biographie générale. t. 22 Firmin-Didot, Paris (1862) (p. 1019).
