= Alice Poulleau =

French geographer, writer

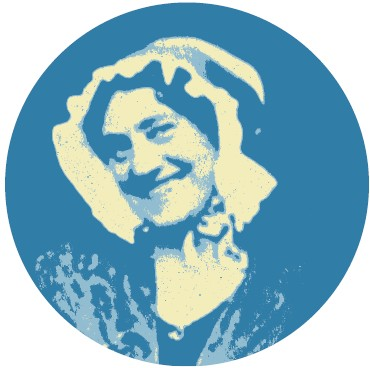
- Alice Poulleau on a poster of Alice Poulleau days in Nolay, France (made from a 1939 photo)
- Born: Alice Marguerite Marie Poulleau; 22 December 1885; Nolay in Côte-d'Or, France
- Died: 20 November 1960 (aged 74); Nolay, France
- Other name: Alice Guibon
- Occupations: Writer, geographer
- Known for: Geographical writings
- Spouse: Georges Guibon (1886–1981)
- Parents: Jean Sébastien Poulleau (father); Marie Maurice (mother)

Alice Marguerite Marie Poulleau (1885–1960), also seen in publications as Alice Guibon, was a French geographer, historian and writer. She is most known for her extensive poetry and writings on her travel in the Middle East, her accounts of the Syrian revolution against French rule, and her works on historical French locations such as Burgundy. A teacher by profession, she founded a college for young girls in Damascus, Syria, before travelling later in life with her husband Georges Guibon. Poulleau's literary work won her several accolades, including the National Literary Travel Grant, and the Hélène Vacaresco Geography Prize.

== Biography ==
Poulleau was born 22 December 1885 in Nolay in Côte-d'Or, France, and died 20 November 1960 in Nolay. Her parents were Jean Sébastien Poulleau and Marie Maurice.

In 1913 and 1914 she studied in Paris to become a "professor of letters," and during the First World War, she worked as a nurse at the Temporary Hospital No. 71, housed in the premises of the former school, Lycée Carnot in Dijon. During her time there, Poulleau created an album of photographs showing people and events that took place during her service there. The album is preserved as a historical document at the Dijon municipal library.

In 1919, Poulleau was offered a teaching post in Alexandria, Egypt, and she took that opportunity to travel to Damascus, Syria, where she founded a college for young girls. She was living in Damascus during the Syrian people's revolt against French control; she later wrote "riots broke out in Syria, which were very harshly suppressed by the French army." During her years there, she wrote two books: In Damascus under the bombs (1926), which was banned by French authorities for distribution in countries, like Syria, under French mandate, and Seven stories from Syria (1927).

Returning to Nolay, France, she worked on the family estate, which she managed with her father.

On 14 October 1933, Poulleau married Georges Guibon (1886–1981), who was also a French geographer and traveler. The couple went together to the Middle East and also made several stays in the Antilles and Australia. Poulleau (sometimes as co author with Georges) published work about their travels in the journal of Geographic Society of Paris.

After the death of her mother in France, she returned to work on the family estate in Nolay and she stayed there from 1939 on, continuing her writing, and sometimes publishing under her married name Alice Guibon. She died in 1960.

== Awards ==
- National Literary Travel Grant in 1929
- Hélène Vacaresco Geography Prize in 1939
- Prize for public education in 1939

== Selected works ==
According to WorldCat.org, Poulleau has 16 works in 65 publications in 4 languages and 156 library holdings.

=== Books on the Middle East ===
- 1927: Seven Histories of Syria (Paris, Eugène Figuière). This book was chosen for the National Literary Travel Grant in 1929
- 1924-1926: In Damascus under the bombs: Journal of a Frenchwoman during the Syrian revolt (Yvetot, Bretteville Frères Imprimeurs)
- 1951: The child of the cedars: Charbel Makhlouf, the miraculous monk from Lebanon. (Paris, P. Téqui).

=== Books on Africa ===
- 1939: Driving the Trans Libyian. (Dieppe, Florida) includes 5 maps and 24 illustrations by the author. This book was chosen for the Hélène Vacaresco Geography Prize in 1939. [Guibon, A., & Guibon, G. (1939). Au Volant Sur la Translibyenne.(Routes Fascistes.) Avec 5 Cartes Et 24 Illustrations de L'auteur.(Georges Guibon... a Collaboré À Ce Livre Pour la Partie Touristique.). La Floride.]

=== Books on Burgundy, France ===
- 1926: Ladies of Burgundy. (Dijon, Bouillerot)
- 1939: Pur jus (Dieppe, La Floride), with illustrations by the author

=== Booklets on the country of Beaune and Nolay, France ===
- 1956: When the beauty slept in the wood (Beaune, edition of Cep burgonde) Childhood memories of the author
- La Chapelote (booklet of a local edition) Life and legends around a chapel

=== Tales ===
- 1928: The dancer of Daphne. (New York)
- 1928: The camel. (New York)
- 1951: The Madonna of the White Thorn and other tales. (Paris Desclée de Brouwer) with illustrations by Josette Boland

=== Poems ===
- 1939: Unrolling the son of Parques. Prize for public education in 1939

=== Others ===
- 1956: The fatal islands. Corse-Elbe-Aix-Sainte Hélène. published by Alice Guibon: (Dieppe, La Floride) with illustrations by the author
- 1939: Guibon, A., Among the sons of Agar. The Bedouins of Syria. (Chez les fils d'Agar. Les bédouins de Syrie.) La Géographie, 71(3), 151
