= Jean Gallois (abbot) =

French scholar and abbot

Jean Gallois (/ɡælˈwɑː/; French: [ɡalwa]; 14 June 1632 – 9 April 1707) was a French scholar and abbé.

== Biography ==
Gallois was born in Paris. He was abbot of the priory of Cuers and a royal librarian. He was named to the Académie des sciences in 1669 and elected a member of the Académie française in 1672. Also a member of the Académie des Inscriptions, he became its permanent secretary. He was professor of mathematics, then of Greek, at the Collège Royal, from 1686; the king named him its inspector, and at the same time he was elected syndic by its assembly of professors.

Gallois was co-founder with Denis de Sallo of the Journal des sçavans, and directed its publication from 1666 to 1674. Readers of the Journal found Sallo outrageously lacking in respectfulness, while also complaining of review articles by Gallois as no more than bland compilations.

Gallois died in Paris.

Voltaire called him a universal scholar, and commented on the Latin lessons he was supposed to have given Colbert in his carriage, travelling between Versailles and Paris.

== Works ==
His Breviarium Colbertinum was published in 1679. An English translation appeared in 1912–13.

== See also ==
- List of Roman Catholic scientist-clerics
