= Alexandre Bachelet =

French politician

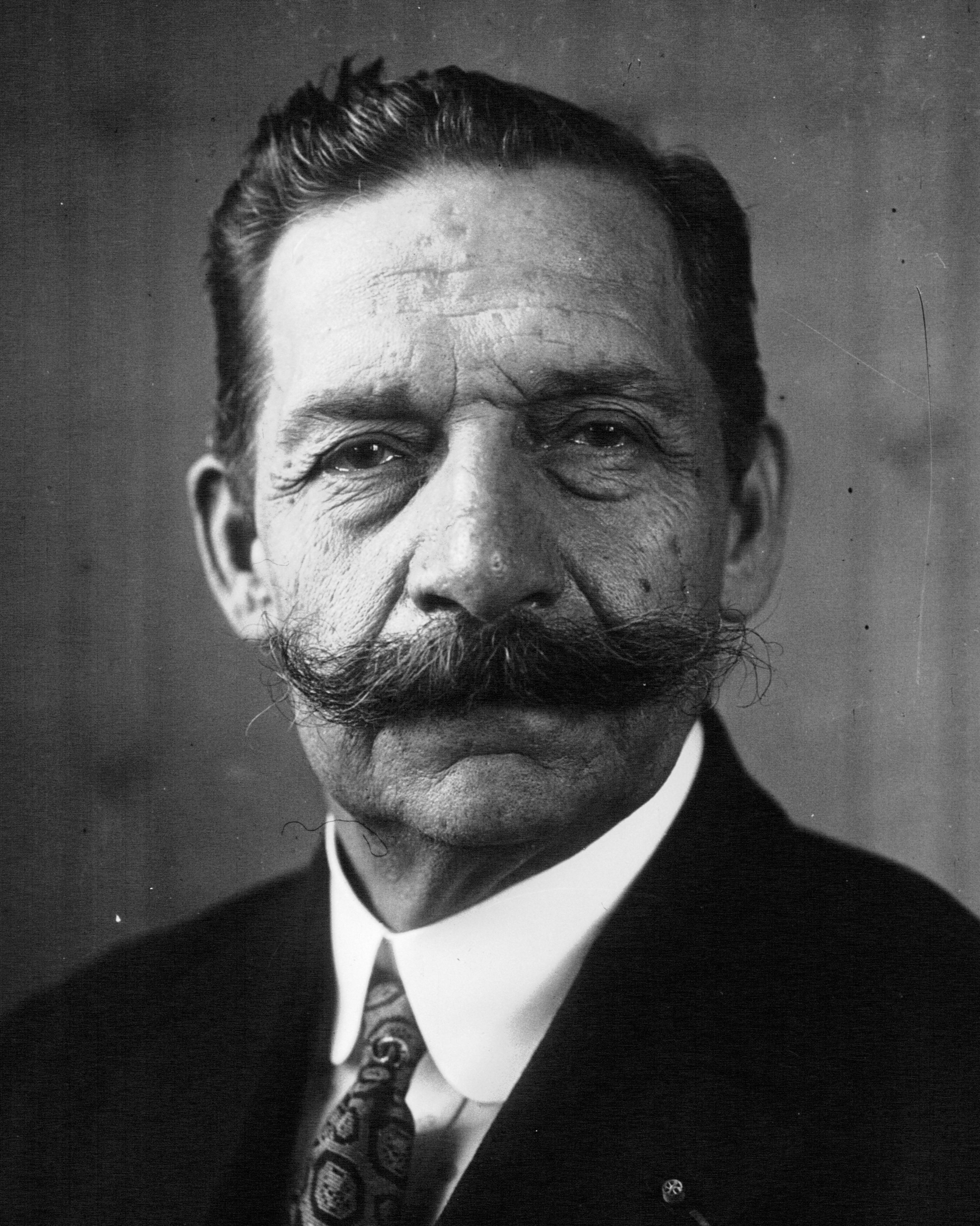
Alexandre Bachelet.

Alexandre Edmond Bachelet (6 January 1866 – 1 August 1945) was a French socialist politician.

Bachelet was born in Saudemont in the Pas-de-Calais into a working-class family. The family moved to Saint-Ouen, a northern suburb of Paris. Bachelet worked as a labourer and studied part-time to become a teacher. He was active in politics as a member of the French Section of the Workers' International (SFIO), the French socialist party. He was elected to the local council in Saint-Ouen in 1912.

When the SFIO split at the Tours Congress of 1920, Bachelet followed the majority into the new French Communist Party but was expelled from the party in 1923 because he remained active in Freemasonry. He was then associated with various minor left-wing groups and continued to serve in local government. He was unsuccessful when he stood for the Cartel des Gauches in the 1924 election to the Chamber of Deputies. With the support of the Communists, with whom he enjoyed good personal relations, he was elected to the French Senate in 1927 and was reelected in 1935.

From 1930 he was a member of the Proletarian Unity Party (PUP), a fusion of minor left-wing groups which affiliated with the International Revolutionary Marxist Centre. He returned to the SFIO in 1937 when the PUP voted to rejoin the Socialist Party.

In June 1940, he was one of the 80 who voted against the grant of special powers to Philippe Pétain and the creation of the Vichy régime. Following the liberation of France in 1944, he served as mayor of Saint-Ouen. He was defeated in the election of May 1945 and died shortly afterwards.

== Sources and further reading ==
- French Senate. "Anciens sénateurs IIIe République" (in French).
- Jolly, Jean (1960). "Dictionnaire des Parlementaires français 1889-1940" (in French). Presses Universitaires de France.
- Ligou, Daniel, Dictionnaire de la Franc-Maçonnerie.
- Maitron, Jean (ed.), Dictionnaire biographique du mouvement ouvrier français.
