= Ernest Lafont =

French politician

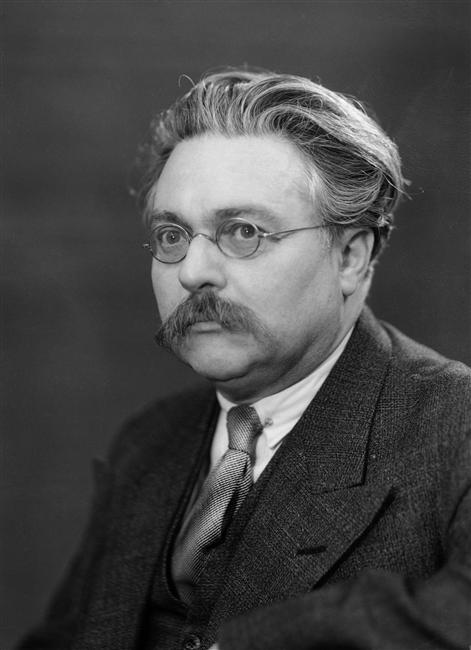

Louis-Ernest Lafont (26 July 1879 in Lyon – 7 May 1946 in Paris) was a French socialist politician. Lafont represented Loire in the French National Assembly between 1914 and 1928, and then Hautes-Alpes between 1928 and 1936. He served as Minister of Public Health 1935-1936. Politically, he was a disciple of Hubert Lagardelle.

A lawyer by profession from a bourgeois background, Lafont was a graduate of the Ecole des sciences politiques and a lawyer at the Paris Court of Appeals. He obtained a doctorate in Law. He served as the legal attorney of the General Confederation of Labour (CGT).

Inside French Section of the Workers' International (SFIO), Lafont belonged to the insurrectionary syndicalist and anti-parliamentary left. In 1910 he contested the parliamentary elections, but trailed behind the winning candidate by merely 500 votes. In 1912 he became the mayor of the socialist local government in Firminy. In 1914 he was elected to the French parliament from the Le Chambon-Feugerolles constituency, with 11,256 votes. During this period Lafont was able to mobilize sizeable support from the middle class of Firminy, particularly through campaigns against alcoholism and prostitution.

Lafont was re-elected to parliament in 1919, the sole Guesdist deputy from Loire.

Lafont travelled to Petrograd in July 1920, seeking to participate in the second congress of the Communist International. However, he was expelled from Russia on Trotsky's orders. Lafont had been accused of contacts with the Polish Socialist Party. Lafont did however become a member of the French Communist Party in the same year. He was expelled from the party in 1923, due to his links to the League for Human Rights.

Lafont joined the Socialist-Communist Union. He was the sole candidate of that party elected in the 1928 French National Assembly election. In the late 1920s, Lafont was one of the more radical profiles in the League for Human Rights, advocating labour rights and pacifism.

Lafont was named Minister of Public Health in the cabinets of Fernand Bouisson and Pierre Laval, formed in 1935. Notably, Laval's first employment had been as the secretary of Lafont whilst Lafont had worked as a lawyer for the CGT. Lafont's cabinet tenures lasted between 1 and 7 June 1935 in the Bouisson cabinet, and between 7 June 1935 and 24 January 1936 in Laval's government. His participation in the national government led to him being expelled socialist parliamentary group. In 1936, he lost his parliamentary seat to the SFIO candidate Auguste Muret (the mayor of Gap).

He was married to Zinaida Lafont. Lafont died on 7 May 1946 in the Seventh arrondissement of Paris, at the age of 66.
