= Nolay, Côte-d'Or =

Nolay
- Commune
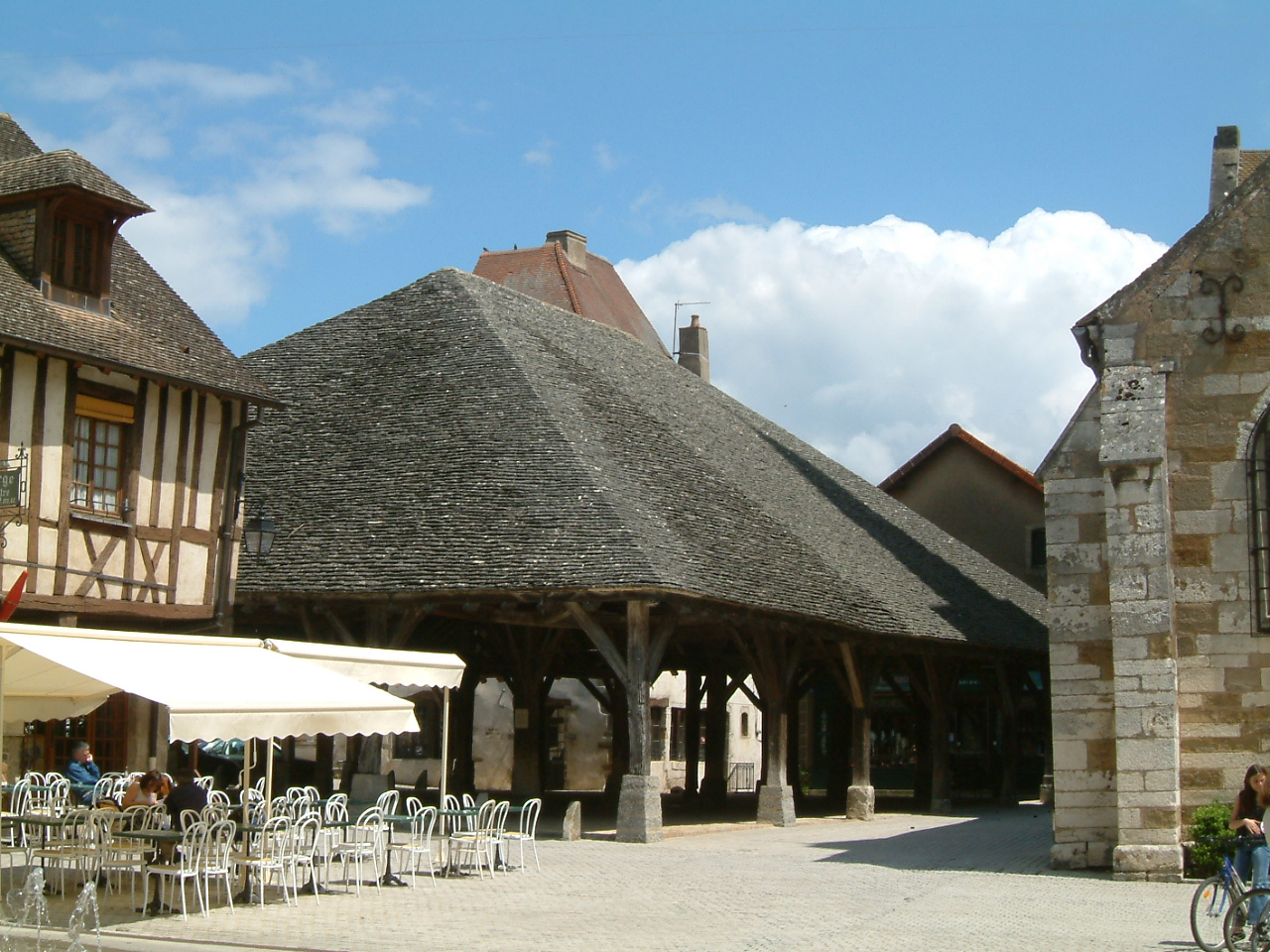
- Old market

- Coat of arms
- Location of Nolay
- Location within France Location within Bourgogne-Franche-Comté
- Coordinates: 46°57′09″N 4°38′02″E
- Country: France
- Region: Bourgogne-Franche-Comté
- Department: Côte-d'Or
- Arrondissement: Beaune
- Canton: Arnay-le-Duc
- Intercommunality: CA Beaune Côte et Sud

Government
  - Mayor (2020–2026): Jean-Pascal Monin
- Area^{1}: 14.3 km^{2} (5.5 sq mi)
- Elevation: 342 m (1,122 ft)
- Highest elevation: 542 m (1,778 ft)
- Lowest elevation: 297 m (974 ft)
- Population (2023): 1,409
  - Density: 98.5/km^{2} (255/sq mi)
- Time zone: UTC+01:00 (CET)
  - Summer (DST): UTC+02:00 (CEST)
- INSEE/Postal code: 21461 /21340
- ^{1} French Land Register data, which excludes lakes, ponds, glaciers > 1 km^{2} (0.386 sq mi or 247 acres) and river estuaries.

Nolay (French pronunciation: [nɔlɛ]) is a commune in the Côte-d'Or department in eastern France. The 18th-century French physician and encyclopédiste Louis-Anne La Virotte (1725–1759) was born in Nolay, as was mathematician, physicist and politician Lazare Carnot (1753–1823).

== Geography ==
Nolay is located in the heart of the Cozanne Valley. The town marks the transition between the forests and plains to the north and west and the hillside vineyards of the wealthy Burgundian wine regions surrounding Beaune and the Chalonnaise hills to the south.

== Population ==
Historical population
Year	Pop.	±% p.a.
1968	1,589	—
1975	1,647	+0.51%
1982	1,582	−0.57%
1990	1,551	−0.25%
1999	1,547	−0.03%
2007	1,482	−0.54%
2012	1,496	+0.19%
2017	1,465	−0.42%
2023	1,409	−0.65%
Source: INSEE

== Sights ==
Nolay is a small medieval market town, widely regarded as one of the most beautiful towns on the southern edge of the Côte-d'Or with its 14th century Central Market and wooden framed houses.

Lazare Carnot's birth house is a local attraction.

== Transportation ==
The D973 runs through the town from La Rochepot and Beaune to the east and Saisy and Autun to the west.

== Notable people of Nolay ==
- Louis-Anne La Virotte, born in 1725 in Nolay, died on 3 March 1759 in Paris, doctor.
- Lazare Carnot (1753-1823), mathematician, physicist, general of the armies of the Republic; fierce opponent of the creation of the Empire (name engraved under the Arc de Triomphe).
- Marie François Sadi Carnot (1837-1894), President of the Republic.
- Claude Marie Carnot de Feulins (1755-1836), general of the armies of the Republic and the Empire.
- Vivant Beaucé (1818-1876), painter and designer.
- Jean Garchery (1872-1957), politician.
- Alice Poulleau (1885-1960), writer, geographer.

== See also ==
- Communes of the Côte-d'Or department
