= Denis de Sallo =

French writer and lawyer

Denis de Sallo, Sieur de la Coudraye (1626 – May 14, 1669) was a French writer and lawyer from Paris, known as the founder of the first French, and European literary and scientific journal – the Journal des sçavans (later renamed Journal des savants).

== Life ==
De Sallo obtained classical education and was admitted to the Paris bar in 1652, although he later devoted himself to scholarly aspects of the law rather than active practice, serving also as a counsel in the French government. He belonged to the clique of Jean-Baptiste Colbert, minister of finance under Louis XIV, and had active contacts with other prominent European scholars.

In 1660, he travelled to Italy, going among others places to Rome and Florence, where he met many Italian scholars.

In 1665 he published the first issue of the Journal des sçavans under the pseudonym Sieur d'Hédouville. The idea for the journal was similar in scope to an outline written by the historian François Eudes de Mézeray who also belonged to Colbert's clique and briefly lived in the same household as de Sallo. It included recording news and inventions in the various arts and sciences, decisions of secular and ecclesiastical courts, reviews of new scholarly books and other items of broader interest to a modern scholar. From 1666 to 1680 his journal was counterfeited in the Netherlands by a publisher Daniel Elzevier (unrelated to the publisher Elsevier).

As a loyal Gallicanist, de Sallo enjoyed considerable trust by the court and received a twenty-year privilege for publishing. His pseudonym comes from the hamlet Hédouville where his valet is said to have come from. The Journal under his direction was suppressed after the thirteenth number, but was revived shortly afterwards, this time under his assistant Jean Gallois' editorship. The official reason for this was de Sallo's failure to submit content for approval before publishing, but was probably a result of the pressure of some influential authors whose works were criticized by the journal.

De Sallo's health deteriorated in his final years so that he was unable to walk; his condition has been attributed to diabetes. He died in Paris in the summer of 1669.

== Sources ==
- Brown, Harcourt (1972). "History and the Learned Journal". Journal of the History of Ideas. 33 (3): 365–378. doi:10.2307/2709041. JSTOR 2709041. PMID 11609708.
