= Gallois (surname) =

Gallois is a French surname. Notable people with the surname include:

- Évariste Galois (1811–1832), French mathematician
- Jean Gallois (abbot) (1632–1707), French scholar and abbé
- Jean Gallois (musicologist), pseudonym of French musicologist Jean Gaillard (1929–2022)
- Louis Gallois (born 1944), French businessman, former CEO of EADS (now Airbus)
- Lucien Gallois (1857–1941), French geographer
- Pascal Gallois (born 1959), French bassoonist, conductor and music teacher, brother of Patrick Gallois
- Patrick Gallois (born 1956), French flutist and conductor
- Pierre Marie Gallois (1911–2010), French air force brigadier general

== See also ==
- Raymond Gallois-Montbrun (1918–1994), French violinist and composer
