= Claude-Marie Carnot =

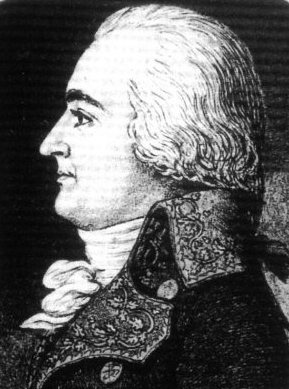
- Born: 15 July 1755; Nolay, Côte-d'Or, France
- Died: 16 October 1836 (aged 81); Autun, Saône-et-Loire, France
- Occupation: Soldier
- Known for: Minister of the Interior

Claude-Marie Carnot, called Carnot-Feulins (English: /kɑːrˈnoʊ/ kar-NOH, French: [klod maʁi kaʁno]; 15 July 1755 – 16 October 1836) was a French soldier, the brother of Lazare Carnot (1753–1823). He was a deputy to the Legislative Assembly of 1791, a Representative during the Hundred Days of 1815 and a provisional commissioner (minister) in the French Executive Commission of 1815.

== Early years ==
Claude-Marie Carnot was born on 15 July 1755 at Nolay, Côte-d'Or. He was a captain of the Engineers when the French Revolution broke out in 1789. He was a moderate supporter of the revolutionary principles. He settled in the Pas-de-Calais, and in 1790 became administrator of this department. On 27 August 1791 he was elected deputy for the department. He was an active member of the Military Committee for the duration of the Assembly.

On 10 August 1792 he was one of the commissioners sent to the Hôtel de Ville. The Swiss guards defending it were destroyed and the king was taken into custody. A decree was made to send commissioners to the armies. Carnot was made Director of the General Department of fortifications, and was instructed to verify the status of the armies on the northern border. He went in turn to the armies of the Moselle and of the Rhine, and later directed the fortifications of Dunkirk when it was besieged by the British. In 1793 he took part in the taking of Veurne, and then rendered important services in the Battle of Wattignies.

When his brother, Lazare Carnot, became a member of the Directory, Carnot-Feulins was promoted brigadier on 16 Prairial year IV and was called back to Paris. He shared his brother's proscription in the year V and remained in Burgundy until the year VIII.

== First Empire ==
Carnot-Feulins returned to his position in the army, but soon resigned due to an argument with the First Consul (Napoleon) about the expedition to Santo Domingo, where he was to be in command of engineering. He then spent several years without salary or pension. In 1814 he was given the rank of general and the position of inspector general of engineering. During the Hundred Days, when Napoleon returned from exile, on 12 May 1815 he was elected a Member of the House of Representatives for Chalon-sur-Saône. He became one of the secretaries of the assembly. After the disaster of Waterloo Carnot-Feulins proposed a decree that the army had served the country well. He was then charged, with his colleagues in office, with taking to Napoleon the act accepting his second abdication.

== Bourbon Restoration ==
Carnot-Feulins's brother, Lazare Carnot, was asked to be part of the provisional government. Carnot-Feulins replaced Lazare as interim minister of the Interior from 23 June to 9 July 1815. Soon afterwards he had to retire since he had reached the age limit. Due to a correspondence between him and his brother, who was in exile, he was arrested, but was almost immediately released. In 1817 the royal government promoted him to the rank of lieutenant-general. He died at Autun, Saône-et-Loire, on 17 July 1838, aged 81.

== Works ==
Works include:

- Carnot-Feullins after Barbier (2013) [1799]. Histoire du Directoire constitutionnel, comparée à celle du gouvernement qui lui a succédé jusqu'au 30 prairial an VII. Paris. p. 280.
- De l'Incompatibilité de la noblesse et de la pairie héréditaire, pour servir à apprécier les changemens proposés à la loi actuelle des élections, par un ancien député (C.-M. Carnot de Feulins). Paris: Beaudouin fils. 1820. p. 43.
- Des Dangers de l'oligarchie dans le cas d'un changement de principes dans la loi actuelle des élections, par un ancien député. (C.-M. Carnot de Feulins). Paris: Plancher. 1820. p. 67.
