= Carnot, Wisconsin =

- Unincorporated community
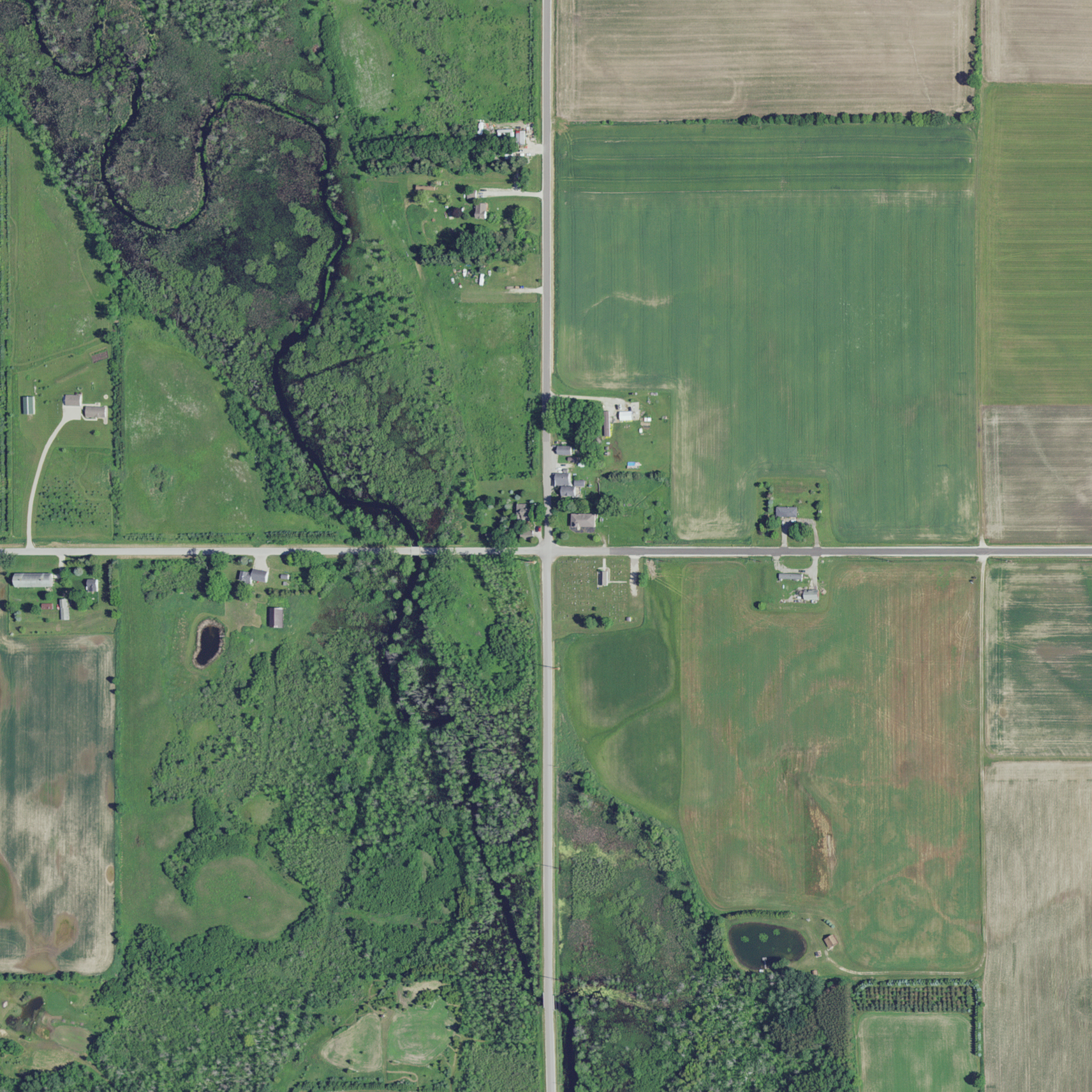
- The four roads leading into Carnot are North Carnot Road, East Carnot Road, South Carnot Road, and West Carnot Road. Stony Creek (left) flows southeast.

- Location within the state of Wisconsin
- Coordinates: 44°42′18″N 87°25′07″W
- Country: United States
- State: Wisconsin
- County: Door
- Town: Forestville
- Time zone: UTC-6 (Central (CST))
  - Summer (DST): UTC-5 (CDT)
- Area code: 920
- GNIS feature ID: 1562724

Carnot is an unincorporated community located in the town of Forestville in southern Door County, Wisconsin, United States. The community contains a church, cemetery and some scattered residences.
