= Proletarian Unity Party (France) =

Proletarian Unity Party Parti de l'Unité Prolétarienne
- Abbreviation: PUP
- Secretary-General: Louis Sellier
- Founded: December 21, 1930
- Dissolved: January 31, 1937
- Merger of: POP; US-C
- Merged into: SFIO
- Ideology: Marxism; Anti-Stalinism
- Political position: Left-wing to Far-left
- National affiliation: Popular Front (1936–1937)
- International affiliation: International Revolutionary Marxist Centre

The Party of Proletarian Unity (French: Parti de l'Unité Prolétarienne, PUP) was a French socialist political party.

== History ==
It was formed on December 21, 1930, by leftists expelled from the French Communist Party (PCF), together with some who had previously belonged to the left wing of the French Section of the Workers' International (SFIO). Its members were known in France as pupistes, and one of its notable leaders was Alexandre Bachelet.

At one time, the party held ten seats in the Chamber of Deputies of the Third Republic. The PUP affiliated to the London Bureau of left-socialist parties. On January 31, 1937, it voted to rejoin the SFIO.

Many of the top members of the PUP subsequently were involved with collaboration with the Axis powers during the Vichy regime.
