= Workers and Peasants Party (France) =

French political party (1929-1930)

Workers and Peasants Party Parti ouvrier et paysan
- Abbreviation: POP
- Leader: Louis Sellier
- Founder: Louis Sellier; Jean Garchery; Charles Joly; Louis Castellaz; Camille Renault; Louis Gélis; Charles Auffra
- Founded: December 22, 1929
- Dissolved: December 21, 1930
- Split from: PCF
- Merged into: PUP
- Ideology: Bukharinism
- Political position: Left-wing to Far-left

The Workers and Peasants Party (Parti ouvrier et paysan) was a short lived communist splinter party in France in 1929-1930.

On November 24, 1929 six municipal councilors were expelled by the French Communist Party, Louis Sellier (ancien secrétaire général du PCF en 1923-1924), Jean Garchery, Charles Joly, Louis Castellaz, Camille Renault, Louis Gélis. Charles Auffray, the mayor of Clichy was also expelled. This was during the Comintern wide drive against "right oppositionists" and "Bukharinites". On December 22, 1929 the expelled councilors formed the new party.

In December 1930 the group joined with other groups to found the Party of Proletarian Unity.

== Sources ==
- Le réquisitoire des Six : Louis Sellier, Jean Garchery, Charles Jolly, Castellaz, Camille Renault, Louis Gelis, conseillers municipaux de Paris et conseillers généraux de la Seine, Paris, Ça ira, Organe du Parti ouvrier et paysan, 1929, 69 p. Fonds Faucier du Centre d’histoire sociale du XXe siècle (UFR 09 de l'Université Paris1-Panthéon Sorbonne)
