= Journal des sçavans =

French scholarly journal

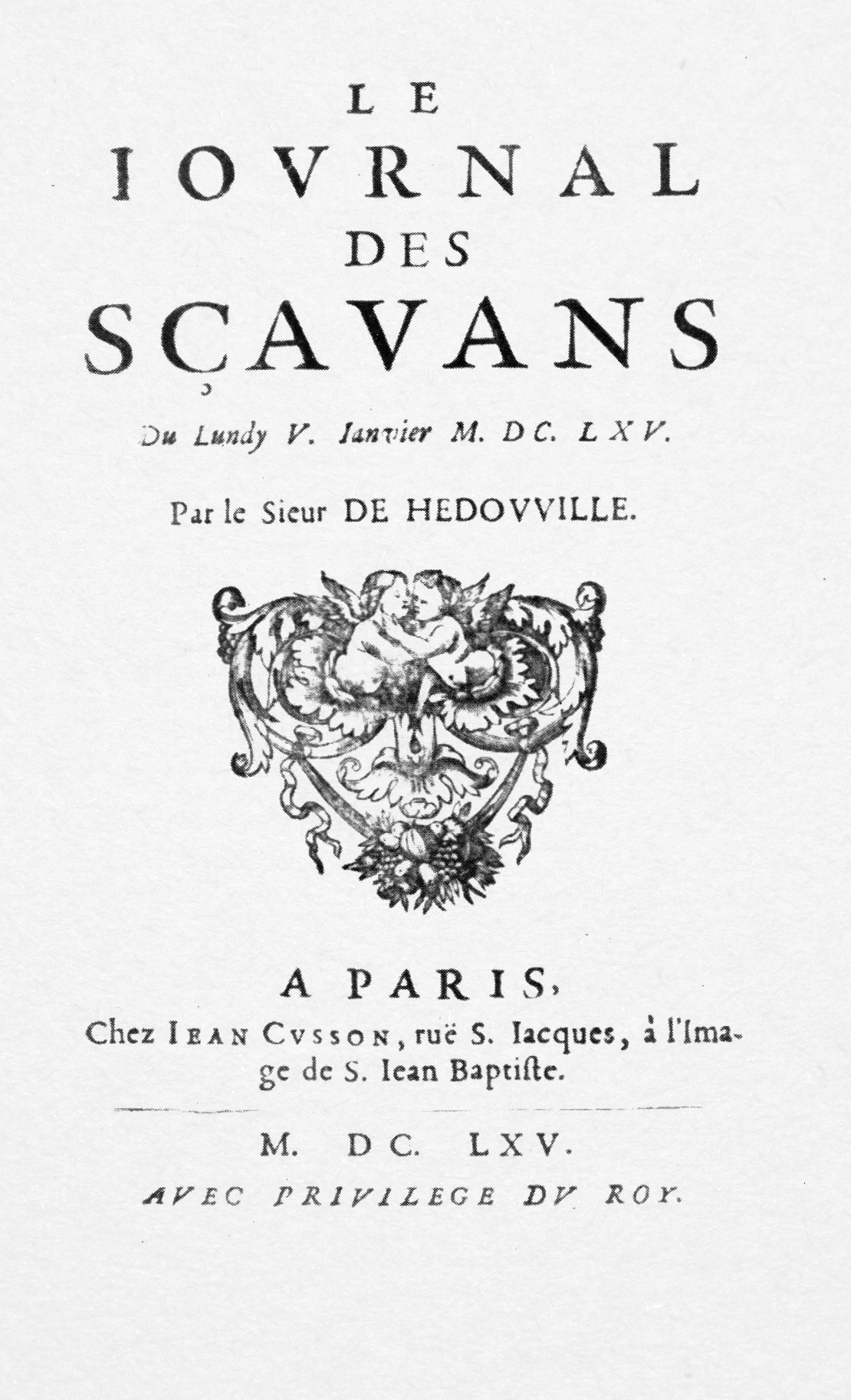
- Language: French

Publication details
- History: 1665–1792, 1797, 1816–present
- Publisher: Peeters Publishers (France)
- Frequency: Annual

Standard abbreviations
- ISO 4: J. Sçavans

Indexing
- ISSN: 1775-383X

Links
- Journal homepage

The Journal des sçavans (later renamed Journal des savans and then Journal des savants, lit. 'Journal of the Learned'), established by Denis de Sallo, is the earliest academic journal published in Europe. It is thought to be the earliest published scientific journal. It currently focuses on European history and premodern literature.

== History ==
The first issue appeared as a twelve-page quarto pamphlet on Monday, 5 January 1665. This was shortly before the first appearance of the Philosophical Transactions of the Royal Society, on 6 March 1665. The 18th-century French physician and encyclopédiste Louis-Anne La Virotte (1725–1759) was introduced to the journal through the protection of chancellor Henri François d'Aguesseau. Its content originally included obituaries of famous men, church history, scientific findings, and legal reports. Natural philosophy was part of its original scope. It is thought to be the first published scientific journal.

The journal ceased publication in 1792, during the French Revolution, and, although it very briefly reappeared in 1797 under the updated title Journal des savants, it did not re-commence regular publication until 1816. From then on, the Journal des savants was published by the National Imprimery under the patronage of the Institut de France. From 1908 to 2020, it was published under the patronage of the Académie des Inscriptions et Belles-Lettres. In 2021, the Belgian company Peeters took over publication. It continues to be a leading academic journal in French humanities scholarship.

== Landmark articles ==
Ole Rømer's determination of the speed of light was published in the journal in 1676, which established that light did not propagate instantly. It came to about 26% slower than the actual value.

In 1684 the journal published François Bernier's racial theories. In 1692, Leibniz published his first explication of Monadology in the journal. In 1762 it carried Abraham Hyacinthe Anquetil-Duperron's landmark study of Zoroastrianism. A self-assured misreading of Japanese sources in an 1817 article by Jean-Pierre Abel-Rémusat led to the name of the Bonin Islands to the south of Japan.
