= Carnot's theorem =

Carnot's theorem or Carnot's principle (English: /kɑːrˈnoʊ/, French: [kaʁno]) may refer to:

In geometry:

- Carnot's theorem (inradius, circumradius), describing a property of the incircle and the circumcircle of a triangle
- Carnot's theorem (conics), describing a relation between triangles and conic sections
- Carnot's theorem (perpendiculars), describing a property of certain perpendiculars on triangle sides

In physics:

- Carnot's theorem (thermodynamics), setting a maximum efficiency obtainable from a heat engine

== See also ==
- Carnot cycle, in thermodynamics
