= Karnaugh =

Karnaugh is a surname. Notable people with the surname include:

- Maurice Karnaugh (1924–2022), American physicist, mathematician, and inventor
- Ron Karnaugh (born 1966), American retired swimmer

== See also ==
- Karnaugh map
