= Carnot's theorem (conics) =

Relation between conic sections and triangles

6 points on the sides of triangle and their common conic section

Carnot's theorem, named after Lazare Carnot (English: /kɑːrˈnoʊ/ kar-NOH, French: [kaʁno]), describes a relation between conic sections and triangles.

In a triangle $ABC$ with points $C_A, C_B$ on the side $AB$, $A_B, A_C$ on the side $BC$ and $B_C, B_A$ on the side $AC$ those six points are located on a common conic section if and only if the following equation holds:

$$\frac{|AC_A|}{|BC_A|}\cdot \frac{|AC_B|}{|BC_B|}\cdot \frac{|BA_B|}{|CA_B|}\cdot \frac{|BA_C|}{|CA_C|} \cdot \frac{|CB_C|}{|AB_C|}\cdot \frac{|CB_A|}{|AB_A|}=1$$.
