= 5-Con triangles =

Similar triangles that share two side lengths

The smallest 5-Con triangles with integral sides.

In geometry, two triangles are said to be 5-Con or almost congruent if they are not congruent triangles but they are similar triangles and share two side lengths (of non-corresponding sides). The 5-Con triangles are important examples for understanding the solution of triangles. Indeed, knowing three angles and two sides (but not their sequence) is not enough to determine a triangle up to congruence. A triangle is said to be 5-Con capable if there is another triangle which is almost congruent to it.

The 5-Con triangles have been discussed by Pawley:, and later by Jones and Peterson. They are briefly mentioned by Martin Gardner in his book Mathematical Circus. Another reference is the following exercise

Explain how two triangles can have five parts (sides, angles) of one triangle congruent to five parts of the other triangle, but not be congruent triangles.

A similar exercise dates back to 1955, and there an earlier reference is mentioned. It is however not possible to date the first occurrence of such standard exercises about triangles.

== Examples ==
There are infinitely many pairs of 5-Con triangles, even up to scaling.

- The smallest 5-Con triangles with integer sides have side lengths (8; 12; 18) and (12; 18; 27). This is an example with obtuse triangles.
- An example of acute 5-Con triangles is (1000; 1100; 1210) and (1100; 1210; 1331).
- The 5-Con right triangles are exactly those obtained from scaling the pair $(1;m;m^2)$ and $(m; m^2; m^3)$ with $m=\sqrt{\tfrac12\bigl(1+\sqrt{5}~\!\bigr)}=\sqrt{\varphi}$ where $\varphi$ is the golden ratio. Consequently, these are Kepler triangles and there can be no right 5-Con triangles with integer sides.
- There are no 5-Con triangles that are equilateral or isosceles because that would require m = 1 and the 5-Con triangles would be congruent.
- There are no integer 5-Con triangles that are Heronian because the sides of integer 5-Con triangles are in a geometric progression.

== Results ==
- Consider 5-Con triangles with side lengths $(a;b;c)$ and $(ma;mb;mc)$ where $m$ is the scaling factor, which we may suppose to be greater than $1$. We may also suppose $a\leq b\leq c$. Then we must have $b=ma$ and $c=mb$. The two triples of side lengths are then of the form:
  $$a(1;m;m^2)\qquad \mathrm{and} \qquad a(m;m^2;m^3).$$
  Conversely, for any $a>0$ and $1<m<\tfrac12\bigl(1+\sqrt{5}~\!\bigr)$, such triples are the side lengths for 5-Con triangles. (Supposing without loss of generality that $a=1$, the greatest number in the first triple is $m^2$ and we only need to ensure $m^2<1+m$; the second triple is obtained from the first by scaling with $m$. So we have two triangles: They are clearly similar and exactly two of the three side lengths coincide.)
- Any 5-Con capable triangle has different side lengths and the middle one is the geometric mean of the other two. The ratio between the largest and the middle side length is then equal to that between the middle and the smallest side length. We can use both this ratio and its inverse for scaling and obtaining an almost congruent triangle.

5-Con triangles with the same greatest side.

- To study the possible shapes of 5-Con triangles, we may restrict to studying the triangles with side lengths
  $$(1;m;m^2)\qquad \mathrm{where} \qquad 1<m<\tfrac12\bigl(1+\sqrt{5}~\!\bigr).$$
  The greatest angle is a strictly increasing continuous function of $m$ and varies from 60° to 180° (the limit cases are excluded). The right triangle corresponds to the value $m=\sqrt{\tfrac12\bigl(1+\sqrt{5}~\!)}$. For convenience, scale the triangle to obtain $(m^{-2};m^{-1};1)$, so that the largest side is fixed: The opposite vertex then moves along a curve as $m$ is varied, as shown in the figure.
- Having two 5-Con triangles with integral sides amounts (in the above notation) to taking any rational number $1<m<\tfrac12\bigl(1+\sqrt{5}~\!\bigr)$ and then choosing $a>0$ in such a way that $am^3$ is an integer. The four involved integral side lengths $(a;am;am^2;am^3)$ do not share any common factor (the 4-tuple is then called primitive) if and only if they are of the form $(x^3;x^2y;xy^2;y^3)$ where $x,y$ are coprime positive integers.

== Further remarks ==
Two 7-Con quadrilaterals.

Defining almost congruent triangles gives a binary relation on the set of triangles. This relation is clearly not reflexive, but it is symmetric. It is not transitive: As a counterexample, consider the three triangles with side lengths (8;12;18), (12;18;27), and (18;27;40.5).

There are infinite sequences of triangles such that any two subsequent terms are 5-Con triangles. It is easy to construct such a sequence from any 5-Con capable triangle: To get an ascending (respectively, descending) sequence, keep the two greatest (respectively, smallest) side lengths and simply choose a third greater (respectively, smaller) side length to obtain a similar triangle. One may easily arrange the triangles in the sequence in a neat way, for example in a spiral.

One generalization is considering 7-Con quadrilaterals, i.e. non-congruent (and not necessarily similar) quadrilaterals where four angles and three sides coincide or, more generally, (2n-1)-Con n-gons.
