= Eisenstein triple =

Set of integers, the lengths of the sides of a triangle with a 60° angle

Similar to a Pythagorean triple, an Eisenstein triple (named after Gotthold Eisenstein) is a set of integers which are the lengths of the sides of a triangle where one of the angles is 60 or 120 degrees. The relation of such triangles to the Eisenstein integers is analogous to the relation of Pythagorean triples to the Gaussian integers.

== Triangles with an angle of 60° ==
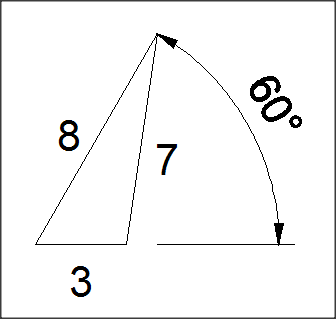
An Eisenstein triple

Triangles with an angle of 60° are a special case of the Law of Cosines:

$$c^2 = a^2 - ab + b^2.$$

When the lengths of the sides are integers, the values form a set known as an Eisenstein triple.

Examples of Eisenstein triples include:

Side a	Side b	Side c
3	8	7
5	8	7
5	21	19
7	15	13
7	40	37
8	15	13
9	24	21

== Triangles with an angle of 120° ==
Triangle with 120° angle and integer sides

A similar special case of the Law of Cosines relates the sides of a triangle with an angle of 120 degrees:

$$c^2 = a^2 + ab + b^2.$$

Examples of such triangles include:

Side a	Side b	Side c
3	5	7
7	8	13
5	16	19

== See also ==
- Loeschian number
- Integer triangles with a 60° angle
- Integer triangles with a 120° angle
