= Integer triangle =

Triangle with integer side lengths

A Heronian triangle with sidelengths c, e and b + d, and height a, all integers.

An integer triangle or integral triangle is a triangle all of whose side lengths are integers. A rational triangle is one whose side lengths are rational numbers; any rational triangle can be rescaled by the lowest common denominator of the sides to obtain a similar integer triangle, so there is a close relationship between integer triangles and rational triangles.

Sometimes other definitions of the term rational triangle are used: Carmichael (1914) and Dickson (1920) use the term to mean a Heronian triangle (a triangle with integral or rational side lengths and area); Conway and Guy (1996) define a rational triangle as one with rational sides and rational angles measured in degrees—the only such triangles are rational-sided equilateral triangles.

== General properties for an integer triangle ==
=== Integer triangles with given perimeter ===
Any triple of positive integers can serve as the side lengths of an integer triangle as long as it satisfies the triangle inequality: the longest side is shorter than the sum of the other two sides. Each such triple defines an integer triangle that is unique up to congruence. So the number of integer triangles (up to congruence) with perimeter p is the number of partitions of p into three positive parts that satisfy the triangle inequality. This is the integer closest to $p^2/48$ when p is even and to $(p + 3)^2 / 48$ when p is odd. It also means that the number of integer triangles with even numbered perimeters $p = 2n$ is the same as the number of integer triangles with odd numbered perimeters $p = 2n - 3.$ Thus there is no integer triangle with perimeter 1, 2 or 4, one with perimeter 3, 5, 6 or 8, and two with perimeter 7 or 10. The sequence of the number of integer triangles with perimeter p, starting at $p = 1,$ is:

0, 0, 1, 0, 1, 1, 2, 1, 3, 2, 4, 3, 5, 4, 7, 5, 8, 7, 10, 8 ... (sequence A005044 in the OEIS)

This is called Alcuin's sequence.

=== Integer triangles with given largest side ===
The number of integer triangles (up to congruence) with given largest side c and integer triple $(a, b, c)$ is the number of integer triples such that $a + b > c$ and $a \leq b \leq c.$ This is the integer value $\lceil \tfrac12(c + 1)\rceil \cdot \lfloor \tfrac12(c + 1)\rfloor.$ Alternatively, for c even it is the double triangular number $\tfrac12c \bigl( \tfrac12c + 1 \bigr)$ and for c odd it is the square $\tfrac14(c + 1)^2.$ It also means that the number of integer triangles with greatest side c exceeds the number of integer triangles with greatest side c − 2 by c. The sequence of the number of non-congruent integer triangles with largest side c, starting at c = 1, is:

1, 2, 4, 6, 9, 12, 16, 20, 25, 30, 36, 42, 49, 56, 64, 72, 81, 90 ... (sequence A002620 in the OEIS)

The number of integer triangles (up to congruence) with given largest side c and integer triple (a, b, c) that lie on or within a semicircle of diameter c is the number of integer triples such that a + b > c , a^{2} + b^{2} ≤ c^{2} and a ≤ b ≤ c. This is also the number of integer sided obtuse or right (non-acute) triangles with largest side c. The sequence starting at c = 1, is:

0, 0, 1, 1, 3, 4, 5, 7, 10, 13, 15, 17, 22, 25, 30, 33, 38, 42, 48 ... (sequence A236384 in the OEIS)

Consequently, the difference between the two above sequences gives the number of acute integer sided triangles (up to congruence) with given largest side c. The sequence starting at c = 1, is:

1, 2, 3, 5, 6, 8, 11, 13, 15, 17, 21, 25, 27, 31, 34, 39, 43, 48, 52 ... (sequence A247588 in the OEIS)

=== Area of an integer triangle ===
By Heron's formula, if T is the area of a triangle whose sides have lengths a, b, and c then

$$4T = \sqrt{(a+b+c)(a+b-c)(a-b+c)(-a+b+c)}.$$

Since all the terms under the radical on the right side of the formula are integers it follows that all integer triangles must have 16T^{2} an integer and T^{2} will be rational.

=== Angles of an integer triangle ===
By the law of cosines, every angle of an integer triangle has a rational cosine. Every angle of an integer right triangle also has rational sine (see Pythagorean triple).

If the angles of any triangle form an arithmetic progression then one of its angles must be 60°. For integer triangles the remaining angles must also have rational cosines and a method of generating such triangles is given below. However, apart from the trivial case of an equilateral triangle, there are no integer triangles whose angles form either a geometric or harmonic progression. This is because such angles have to be rational angles of the form $\pi p/q$ with rational $0 < p/q < 1.$ But all the angles of integer triangles must have rational cosines and this will occur only when $p/q = 1/3.$ i.e. the integer triangle is equilateral.

The square of each internal angle bisector of an integer triangle is rational, because the general triangle formula for the internal angle bisector of angle A is $2\sqrt{bcs(s-a)}\big/(b+c)$ where s is the semiperimeter (and likewise for the other angles' bisectors).

=== Side split by an altitude ===
Any altitude dropped from a vertex onto an opposite side or its extension will split that side or its extension into rational lengths.

=== Medians ===
The square of twice any median of an integer triangle is an integer, because the general formula for the squared median m_{a}^{2} to side a is $\tfrac14(2b^2+2c^2-a^2)$, giving (2m_{a})^{2} = 2b^{2} + 2c^{2} − a^{2} (and likewise for the medians to the other sides).

=== Circumradius and inradius ===
Because the square of the area of an integer triangle is rational, the square of its circumradius is also rational, as is the square of the inradius.

The ratio of the inradius to the circumradius of an integer triangle is rational, equaling $4T^2 / sabc$ for semiperimeter s and area T.

The product of the inradius and the circumradius of an integer triangle is rational, equaling $abc \big/ 2(a+b+c).$

Thus the squared distance between the incenter and the circumcenter of an integer triangle, given by Euler's theorem as $R^2 - 2Rr$ is rational.

== Heronian triangles ==
A Heronian triangle, also known as a Heron triangle or a Hero triangle, is a triangle with integer sides and integer area.

All Heronian triangles can be placed on a lattice with each vertex at a lattice point. Furthermore, if an integer triangle can be place on a lattice with each vertex at a lattice point it must be Heronian.

=== General formula ===
Every Heronian triangle has sides proportional to

$$a = n(m^{2}+k^{2})$$
$$b = m(n^{2}+k^{2})$$
$$c = (m+n)(mn-k^{2})$$
$$\text{Semiperimeter} = mn(m+n)$$
$$\text{Area} = mnk(m+n)(mn-k^{2})$$

for integers m, n and k subject to the constraints:

$$\gcd{(m,n,k)} = 1$$
$$mn > k^2 \ge m^2n/(2m+n)$$
$$m \ge n \ge 1.$$

The proportionality factor is generally a rational $p/q$ where q = gcd(a,b,c) reduces the generated Heronian triangle to its primitive and $p$ scales up this primitive to the required size.

=== Pythagorean triangles ===
A Pythagorean triangle is right-angled and Heronian. Its three integer sides are known as a Pythagorean triple or Pythagorean triplet or Pythagorean triad. All Pythagorean triples $(a, b, c)$ with hypotenuse $c$ which are primitive (the sides having no common factor) can be generated by

$$a = m^2 - n^2, \,$$
$$b = 2mn, \,$$
$$c = m^2 + n^2, \,$$
$$\text{Semiperimeter} = m(m+n) \,$$
$$\text{Area} = mn(m^2-n^2) \,$$

where m and n are coprime integers and one of them is even with m > n.

Every even number greater than 2 can be the leg of a Pythagorean triangle (not necessarily primitive) because if the leg is given by $a=2m$ and we choose $b=(a/2)^2-1=m^2-1$ as the other leg then the hypotenuse is $c=m^2+1$. This is essentially the generation formula above with $n$ set to 1 and allowing $m$ to range from 2 to infinity.

==== Pythagorean triangles with integer altitude from the hypotenuse ====
There are no primitive Pythagorean triangles with integer altitude from the hypotenuse. This is because twice the area equals any base times the corresponding height: 2 times the area thus equals both ab and cd where d is the height from the hypotenuse c. The three side lengths of a primitive triangle are coprime, so $d = ab/c$ is in fully reduced form; since c cannot equal 1 for any primitive Pythagorean triangle, d cannot be an integer.

However, any Pythagorean triangle with legs x, y and hypotenuse z can generate a Pythagorean triangle with an integer altitude, by scaling up the sides by the length of the hypotenuse z. If d is the altitude, then the generated Pythagorean triangle with integer altitude is given by

$$(a,b,c,d)=(xz, yz, z^2, xy). \,$$

Consequently, all Pythagorean triangles with legs a and b, hypotenuse c, and integer altitude d from the hypotenuse, with $\gcd(a, b, c, d) = 1$, which necessarily satisfy both a^{2} + b^{2} = c^{2} and $\tfrac{1}{a^{2}}+\tfrac{1}{b^{2}}=\tfrac{1}{d^{2}}$, are generated by

$$a=(m^2-n^2)(m^2+n^2), \,$$

$$b=2mn(m^2+n^2), \,$$

$$c=(m^2+n^2)^2, \,$$

$$d=2mn(m^2-n^2), \,$$

$$\text{Semiperimeter}=m(m+n)(m^2+n^2) \,$$

$$\text{Area}=mn(m^2-n^2)(m^2+n^2)^2 \,$$

for coprime integers m, n with m > n.

=== Heronian triangles with sides in arithmetic progression ===
A triangle with integer sides and integer area has sides in arithmetic progression if and only if the sides are (b – d, b, b + d), where

$$b=2(m^2+3n^2)/g,$$

$$d=(m^2-3n^2)/g,$$

and where g is the greatest common divisor of $m^2-3n^2,$ $2mn,$ and $m^2+3n^2.$

=== Heronian triangles with one angle equal to twice another ===
All Heronian triangles with B = 2A are generated by either

$$\begin{align}
a &= \tfrac14 k^2(s^2+r^2)^2, \\[5mu]
b &= \tfrac12 k^2(s^4-r^4), \\[5mu]
c &= \tfrac14 k^2(3s^4-10s^2 r^2+3r^4), \\[5mu]
\text{Area} &= \tfrac12 k^2 csr(s^2-r^2),
\end{align}$$

with integers k, s, r such that $s^2 > 3r^2,$ or

$$\begin{align}
a &= \tfrac14 q^2 (u^2 + v^2)^2, \\[5mu]
b &= q^{2}uv(u^2 + v^2), \\[5mu]
c &= \tfrac14 q^2(14u^2v^2 - u^4 - v^4), \\[5mu]
\text{Area} &= \tfrac12 q^2cuv(v^2 -u^2),
\end{align}$$

with integers q, u, v such that $v > u$ and $v^2< (7+4\sqrt{3})u^2.$

No Heronian triangles with B = 2A are isosceles or right triangles because all resulting angle combinations generate angles with non-rational sines, giving a non-rational area or side.

=== Isosceles Heronian triangles ===
All isosceles Heronian triangles are decomposable. They are formed by joining two congruent Pythagorean triangles along either of their common legs such that the equal sides of the isosceles triangle are the hypotenuses of the Pythagorean triangles, and the base of the isosceles triangle is twice the other Pythagorean leg. Consequently, every Pythagorean triangle is the building block for two isosceles Heronian triangles since the join can be along either leg. All pairs of isosceles Heronian triangles are given by rational multiples of the following side lengths:

$$\begin{aligned}
a &= 2(u^2 - v^2),  &\quad\quad a &= 4uv, \\
b &= u^2 + v^2,     &\quad\quad b &= u^2 + v^2, \\
c &= u^2 + v^2,     &\quad\quad c &= u^2 + v^2, \\
\text{Area} &= 2uv(u^2 - v^2),
\end{aligned}$$

for coprime integers of opposite parity $u$ and $v$, with $u > v$.

=== Heronian triangles whose perimeter is four times a prime ===
It has been shown that a Heronian triangle whose perimeter is four times a prime is uniquely associated with the prime and that the prime is congruent to $1$ or $3$ modulo $8$. It is well known that such a prime $p$ can be uniquely partitioned into integers $m$ and $n$ such that $p=m^2+2n^2$ (see Euler's idoneal numbers). Furthermore, it has been shown that such Heronian triangles are primitive since the smallest side of the triangle has to be equal to the prime that is one quarter of its perimeter.

Consequently, all primitive Heronian triangles whose perimeter is four times a prime can be generated by

$$a=m^2+2n^2$$
$$b=m^2+4n^2$$
$$c=2(m^2+n^2)$$
$$\text{Semiperimeter}=2a=2(m^2+2n^2)$$
$$\text{Area}=2mn(m^2+2n^2)$$

for integers $m$ and $n$ such that $m^2+2n^2$ is a prime.

Furthermore, the factorization of the area is $2mnp$ where $p=m^2+2n^2$ is prime. However the area of a Heronian triangle is always divisible by $6$. This gives the result that apart from when $m=1$ and $n=1,$ which gives $p=3,$ all other parings of $m$ and $n$ must have $m$ odd with only one of them divisible by $3$.

=== Heronian triangles with rational angle bisectors ===
If in a Heronian triangle the angle bisector $w_a$ of the angle $\alpha$, the angle bisector $w_b$ of the angle $\beta$ and the angle bisector $w_c$ of the angle $\gamma$ have a rational relationship with the three sides then not only $\alpha, \beta, \gamma$ but also $\tfrac12\alpha$, $\tfrac12\beta$ and $\tfrac12\gamma$ must be Heronian angles. Namely, if both angles $\tfrac12\alpha$ and $\tfrac12\beta$ are Heronian then $\tfrac12\gamma$, the complement of $\tfrac12\alpha + \tfrac12\beta$, must also be a Heronian angle, so that all three angle-bisectors are rational. This is also evident if one multiplies:

$$w_a = \frac{2\sqrt{s(s-a)} \cdot \sqrt{bc}}{b+c} \quad w_b = \frac{2\sqrt{s(s-b)} \cdot \sqrt{ac}}{a+c} \quad w_c = \frac{2\sqrt{s(s-c)} \cdot \sqrt{ab}}{a+b}$$

together. Namely, through this one obtains:

$$w_a \cdot w_b \cdot w_c = \frac{8s \cdot J \cdot a \cdot b \cdot c}{(a+b)(a+c)(b+c)},$$

where $s$ denotes the semi-perimeter, and $J$ the area of the triangle.

All similarity classes of Heronian triangles with rational angle bisectors are generated by

$$a = mn(p^2+q^2)$$
$$b = pq(m^2+n^2)$$
$$c = (mq+np)(mp-nq)$$
$$\text{Semiperimeter}=s=(a+b+c)/2=mp(mq+np)$$
$$s-a=mq(mp-nq)$$
$$s-b=np(mp-nq)$$
$$s-c=nq(mq+np)$$
$$\text{Area}=J=mnpq(mq+np)(mp-nq)$$

where $m, n, p, q$ are such that

$$m = t^2-u^2$$
$$n=2tu$$
$$p = v^2-w^2$$
$$q=2vw$$

where $t, u, v, w$ are arbitrary integers such that

$t$ and $u$ coprime,
$v$ and $w$ coprime.

=== Heronian triangles with integer inradius and exradii ===
There are infinitely many decomposable, and infinitely many indecomposable, primitive Heronian (non-Pythagorean) triangles with integer radii for the incircle and each excircle. A family of decomposable ones is given by

$$a=4n^2$$
$$b=(2n+1)(2n^2 -2n+1)$$
$$c=(2n-1)(2n^2 +2n+1)$$
$$r=2n-1$$
$$r_a=2n+1$$
$$r_b=2n^2$$
$$r_c=\text{Area}=2n^2(2n-1)(2n+1);$$

and a family of indecomposable ones is given by

$$a=5(5n^2 +n-1)$$
$$b=(5n+3)(5n^2-4n+1)$$
$$c=(5n-2)(5n^2 +6n+2)$$
$$r=5n-2$$
$$r_a=5n+3$$
$$r_b=5n^2+n-1$$
$$r_c=\text{Area}=(5n-2)(5n+3)(5n^2 +n-1).$$

=== Heronian triangles as faces of a tetrahedron ===
There exist tetrahedra having integer-valued volume and Heron triangles as faces. One example has one edge of 896, the opposite edge of 190, and the other four edges of 1073; two faces have areas of 436800 and the other two have areas of 47120, while the volume is 62092800.

=== Heronian triangles in a 2D lattice ===
A 2D lattice is a regular array of isolated points where if any one point is chosen as the Cartesian origin (0, 0), then all the other points are at (x, y) where x and y range over all positive and negative integers. A lattice triangle is any triangle drawn within a 2D lattice such that all vertices lie on lattice points. By Pick's theorem a lattice triangle has a rational area that either is an integer or a half-integer (has a denominator of 2). If the lattice triangle has integer sides then it is Heronian with integer area.

Furthermore, it has been proved that all Heronian triangles can be drawn as lattice triangles. Consequently, an integer triangle is Heronian if and only if it can be drawn as a lattice triangle.

There are infinitely many primitive Heronian (non-Pythagorean) triangles which can be placed on an integer lattice with all vertices, the incenter, and all three excenters at lattice points. Two families of such triangles are the ones with parametrizations given above at #Heronian triangles with integer inradius and exradii.

== Integer automedian triangles ==
An automedian triangle is one whose medians are in the same proportions (in the opposite order) as the sides. If x, y, and z are the three sides of a right triangle, sorted in increasing order by size, and if 2x < z, then z, x + y, and y − x are the three sides of an automedian triangle. For instance, the right triangle with side lengths 5, 12, and 13 can be used in this way to form the smallest non-trivial (i.e., non-equilateral) integer automedian triangle, with side lengths 13, 17, and 7.

Consequently, using Euclid's formula, which generates primitive Pythagorean triangles, it is possible to generate primitive integer automedian triangles as

$$a=|m^2-2mn-n^2|$$
$$b=m^2+2mn-n^2$$
$$c=m^2+n^2$$

with $m$ and $n$ coprime and $m+n$ odd, and $n<m<n\sqrt{3}$ (if the quantity inside the absolute value signs is negative) or $m>(2+\sqrt{3})n$ (if that quantity is positive) to satisfy the triangle inequality.

An important characteristic of the automedian triangle is that the squares of its sides form an arithmetic progression. Specifically, $c^2-a^2 = b^2-c^2$ so $2c^2 = a^2+b^2.$

== Integer triangles with specific angle properties ==
=== Integer triangles with a rational angle bisector ===
A triangle family with integer sides $a,b,c$ and with rational bisector $d$ of angle A is given by

$$a = 2(k^2-m^2),$$
$$b = (k-m)^2,$$
$$c = (k+m)^2,$$
$$d = \frac{2km(k^2-m^2)}{k^2+m^2},$$

with integers $k>m>0$.

The scalene integer triangle with the smallest perimeter having one integer angle bisector has sides $a=6$, $b=7$, $c=8$, and the bisector of angle $B$, whose length is $d_B=6$.

The scalene integer triangle with the smallest perimeter having two integer angle bisectors has sides $a=112$, $b=196$, $c=231$, and angle bisectors $d_B=132$ and $d_C=98$.

The scalene integer triangle with the smallest perimeter having three integer angle bisectors has sides $a=3111108$, $b=3367000$, $c=3892252$, and angle bisectors $d_A=3270800$, $d_B=3051279$, and $d_C=2587200$. In the latter case, the integrality of all three angle bisectors also implies that the area of the triangle is an integer ($\text{Area}=5028048305280$).

=== Integer triangles with integer n-sectors of all angles ===
There exist infinitely many non-similar triangles in which the three sides and the bisectors of each of the three angles are integers.

There exist infinitely many non-similar triangles in which the three sides and the two trisectors of each of the three angles are integers.

However, for n > 3 there exist no triangles in which the three sides and the (n – 1) n-sectors of each of the three angles are integers.

=== Integer triangles with one angle with a given rational cosine ===
Integer triangles with one angle at vertex A having given rational cosine h / k (h < 0 or > 0; k > 0) are given by

$$a = p^2-2pqh+q^2k^2,$$
$$b = p^2-q^2k^2,$$
$$c = 2qk(p-qh),$$

where p and q are any coprime positive integers such that p > qk. All primitive solutions can be obtained by dividing a, b, and c by their greatest common divisor.

==== Integer triangles with a 60° angle (angles in arithmetic progression) ====
All integer triangles with a 60° angle have their angles in an arithmetic progression. All such triangles are proportional to:

$$a = 4mn,$$
$$b = 3m^2+n^2,$$
$$c = 2mn+|3m^2-n^2|$$

with coprime integers m, n and 1 ≤ n ≤ m or 3m ≤ n. From here, all primitive solutions can be obtained by dividing a, b, and c by their greatest common divisor.

Integer triangles with a 60° angle can also be generated by

$$a = m^2-mn+n^2,$$
$$b = 2mn-n^2,$$
$$c = m^2-n^2,$$

with coprime integers m, n with 0 < n < m (the angle of 60° is opposite to the side of length a). From here, all primitive solutions can be obtained by dividing a, b, and c by their greatest common divisor (e.g. an equilateral triangle solution is obtained by taking m = 2 and n = 1, but this produces a = b = c = 3, which is not a primitive solution). See also

More precisely, If $m \equiv -n \!\pmod{3}$, then $\gcd(a,b,c) = 3$, otherwise $\gcd(a,b,c) = 1$. Two different pairs $(m, n)$ and $(m, m-n)$ generate the same triple. Unfortunately the two pairs can both have a gcd of 3, so we can't avoid duplicates by simply skipping that case. Instead, duplicates can be avoided by $n$ going only till $m/2$. We still need to divide by 3 if the gcd is 3. The only solution for $n = m/2$ under the above constraints is $(3,3,3) \equiv (1,1,1)$ for $m=2, n=1$. With this additional $n \leq m/2$ constraint all triples can be generated uniquely.

An Eisenstein triple is a set of integers which are the lengths of the sides of a triangle where one of the angles is 60 degrees.

==== Integer triangles with a 120° angle ====
Integer triangles with a 120° angle can be generated by

$$a = m^2 + mn + n^2,$$
$$b = 2mn+n^2,$$
$$c = m^2 - n^2,$$

with coprime integers m, n with 0 < n < m (the angle of 120° is opposite to the side of length a). From here, all primitive solutions can be obtained by dividing a, b, and c by their greatest common divisor. The smallest solution, for m = 2 and n = 1, is the triangle with sides (3,5,7). See also.

More precisely, If $m \equiv n \!\pmod{3}$, then $\gcd(a,b,c) = 3$, otherwise $\gcd(a,b,c) = 1$. Since the biggest side a can only be generated with a single $(m, n)$ pair, each primitive triple can be generated in precisely two ways: once directly with a gcd of 1, and once indirectly with a gcd of 3. Therefore, in order to generate all primitive triples uniquely, one can just add additional $m \not\equiv n \!\pmod{3}$ condition.

=== Integer triangles with one angle equal to an arbitrary rational number times another angle ===
For positive coprime integers h and k, the triangle with the following sides has angles $h \alpha$, $k \alpha$, and $\pi - (h+k) \alpha$ and hence two angles in the ratio h : k, and its sides are integers:

$$a = q^{h+k-1} \frac{\sin h \alpha}{\sin \alpha} = q^k \cdot\sum_{0 \leq i \leq \frac{h-1}{2}}(-1)^{i}\binom{h}{2i+1}p^{h-2i-1}(q^2-p^2)^i,$$

$$b = q^{h+k-1} \frac{\sin k \alpha}{\sin \alpha} = q^h \cdot\sum_{0 \leq i \leq \frac{k-1}{2}}(-1)^{i}\binom{k}{2i+1}p^{k-2i-1}(q^2-p^2)^i,$$

$$c = q^{h+k-1} \frac{\sin (h+k) \alpha}{\sin \alpha} = \sum_{0 \leq i \leq \frac{h+k-1}{2}}(-1)^{i}\binom{h+k}{2i+1}p^{h+k-2i-1}(q^2-p^2)^i,$$

where $\alpha = \cos^{-1} \!\frac{p}{q}$ and p and q are any coprime integers such that $\cos \frac{\pi}{h+k} < \frac{p}{q} < 1$.

==== Integer triangles with one angle equal to twice another ====
With angle A opposite side $a$ and angle B opposite side $b$, some triangles with B = 2A are generated by

$$a = n^2,$$
$$b = mn,$$
$$c = m^2 - n^2,$$

with integers m, n such that 0 < n < m < 2n.

All triangles with B = 2A (whether integer or not) satisfy $a(a+c) = b^2.$

==== Integer triangles with one angle equal to 3/2 times another ====
The equivalence class of similar triangles with $B = \tfrac32 A$ are generated by

$$a=mn^3,$$
$$b=n^2(m^2-n^2),$$
$$c=(m^2 - n^2)^2 - m^2 n^2,$$

with integers $m, n$ such that $0<\varphi n<m<2n$, where $\varphi$ is the golden ratio $\varphi = \tfrac12\bigl(1+\sqrt{5}\bigr) \approx 1.61803$.

All triangles with $B = \tfrac32 A$ (whether with integer sides or not) satisfy $(b^{2}-a^{2})(b^{2}-a^{2}+bc) = a^{2}c^{2}.$

==== Integer triangles with one angle three times another ====
We can generate the full equivalence class of similar triangles that satisfy B = 3A by using the formulas

$$a=n^{3}, \,$$
$$b=n(m^{2}-n^{2}), \,$$
$$c=m(m^{2}-2n^{2}), \,$$

where $m$ and $n$ are integers such that $\sqrt{2}n < m < 2n$.

All triangles with B = 3A (whether with integer sides or not) satisfy $ac^2 = (b-a)^{2}(b+a).$

=== Integer triangles with three rational angles ===
The only integer triangle with three rational angles (rational numbers of degrees, or equivalently rational fractions of a full turn) is the equilateral triangle. This is because integer sides imply three rational cosines by the law of cosines, and by Niven's theorem a rational cosine coincides with a rational angle if and only if the cosine equals 0, ±1/2, or ±1. The only ones of these giving an angle strictly between 0° and 180° are the cosine value 1/2 with the angle 60°, the cosine value –1/2 with the angle 120°, and the cosine value 0 with the angle 90°. The only combination of three of these, allowing multiple use of any of them and summing to 180°, is three 60° angles.

== Integer triangles with integer ratio of circumradius to inradius ==
Conditions are known in terms of elliptic curves for an integer triangle to have an integer ratio N of the circumradius to the inradius. The smallest case, that of the equilateral triangle, has N = 2. In every known case, $N \equiv 2 \!\pmod{8}$ – that is, $N - 2$ is divisible by 8.

== 5-Con triangle pairs ==
A 5-Con triangle pair is a pair of triangles that are similar but not congruent and that share three angles and two sidelengths. Primitive integer 5-Con triangles, in which the four distinct integer sides (two sides each appearing in both triangles, and one other side in each triangle) share no prime factor, have triples of sides

$(x^3, x^2y, xy^2)$ and $(x^2y, xy^2, y^3)$

for positive coprime integers x and y. The smallest example is the pair (8, 12, 18), (12, 18, 27), generated by x = 2, y = 3.

== Particular integer triangles ==
- The only triangle with consecutive integers for sides and area has sides (3, 4, 5) and area 6.
- The only triangle with consecutive integers for an altitude and the sides has sides (13, 14, 15) and altitude from side 14 equal to 12.
- The (2, 3, 4) triangle and its multiples are the only triangles with integer sides in arithmetic progression and having the complementary exterior angle property. This property states that if angle C is obtuse and if a segment is dropped from B meeting perpendicularly AC extended at P, then ∠CAB=2∠CBP.
- The (3, 4, 5) triangle and its multiples are the only integer right triangles having sides in arithmetic progression.
- The (4, 5, 6) triangle and its multiples are the only triangles with one angle being twice another and having integer sides in arithmetic progression.
- The (3, 5, 7) triangle and its multiples are the only triangles with a 120° angle and having integer sides in arithmetic progression.
- The only integer triangle with area = semiperimeter has sides (3, 4, 5).
- The only integer triangles with area = perimeter have sides (5, 12, 13), (6, 8, 10), (6, 25, 29), (7, 15, 20), and (9, 10, 17). Of these the first two, but not the last three, are right triangles.
- There exist integer triangles with three rational medians. The smallest has sides (68, 85, 87). Others include (127, 131, 158), (113, 243, 290), (145, 207, 328) and (327, 386, 409).
- There are no isosceles Pythagorean triangles.
- The only primitive Pythagorean triangles for which the square of the perimeter equals an integer multiple of the area are (3, 4, 5) with perimeter 12 and area 6 and with the ratio of perimeter squared to area being 24; (5, 12, 13) with perimeter 30 and area 30 and with the ratio of perimeter squared to area being 30; and (9, 40, 41) with perimeter 90 and area 180 and with the ratio of perimeter squared to area being 45.
- There exists a unique (up to similitude) pair of a rational right triangle and a rational isosceles triangle which have the same perimeter and the same area. The unique pair consists of the (377, 135, 352) triangle and the (366, 366, 132) triangle. There is no pair of such triangles if the triangles are also required to be primitive integral triangles. The authors stress the striking fact that the second assertion can be proved by an elementary argumentation (they do so in their appendix A), whilst the first assertion needs modern highly non-trivial mathematics.

== See also ==
- Brahmagupta triangle, a Heronian triangle in which the side lengths are consecutive integers
- Robbins pentagon, a cyclic pentagon with integer sides and integer area
- Euler brick, a cuboid with integer edges and integer face diagonals
- Tetrahedron § Integer tetrahedra
