= Brahmagupta triangle =

Triangle with specific characteristics

A Brahmagupta triangle is a triangle whose side lengths are consecutive positive integers and area is a positive integer. The triangle whose side lengths are 3, 4, 5 is a Brahmagupta triangle and so also is the triangle whose side lengths are 13, 14, 15. The Brahmagupta triangle is a special case of the Heronian triangle which is a triangle whose side lengths and area are all positive integers but the side lengths need not necessarily be consecutive integers. A Brahmagupta triangle is called as such in honor of the Indian astronomer and mathematician Brahmagupta (c. 598 – c. 668 CE) who gave a list of the first eight such triangles without explaining the method by which he computed that list.

A Brahmagupta triangle is also called a Fleenor-Heronian triangle in honor of Charles R. Fleenor who discussed the concept in a paper published in 1996. Some of the other names by which Brahmagupta triangles are known are super-Heronian triangle and almost-equilateral Heronian triangle.

The problem of finding all Brahmagupta triangles is an old problem. A closed form solution of the problem was found by Reinhold Hoppe in 1880.

== Generating Brahmagupta triangles ==
Let the side lengths of a Brahmagupta triangle be t − 1, t, and t + 1, where t is an integer greater than 1. Using Heron's formula, the area A of the triangle can be shown to be
$$A = \frac{t}{2} \sqrt{3 \left( \left(\tfrac{t}{2}\right)^2 -1 \right)  }$$
Since A has to be an integer, t must be even and so it can be taken as $t=2x$ where x is an integer. Thus,
$$A = x\sqrt{3(x^2-1) }$$
Since $\sqrt{3(x^2-1) }$ has to be an integer, one must have $x^2-1 =3y^2$ for some integer y. Hence, x must satisfy the following Diophantine equation:
$$x^2 - 3y^2 = 1 .$$
This is an example of the so-called Pell's equation x^{2} − Ny^{2} = 1 with N = 3. The methods for solving the Pell's equation can be applied to find values of the integers x and y.

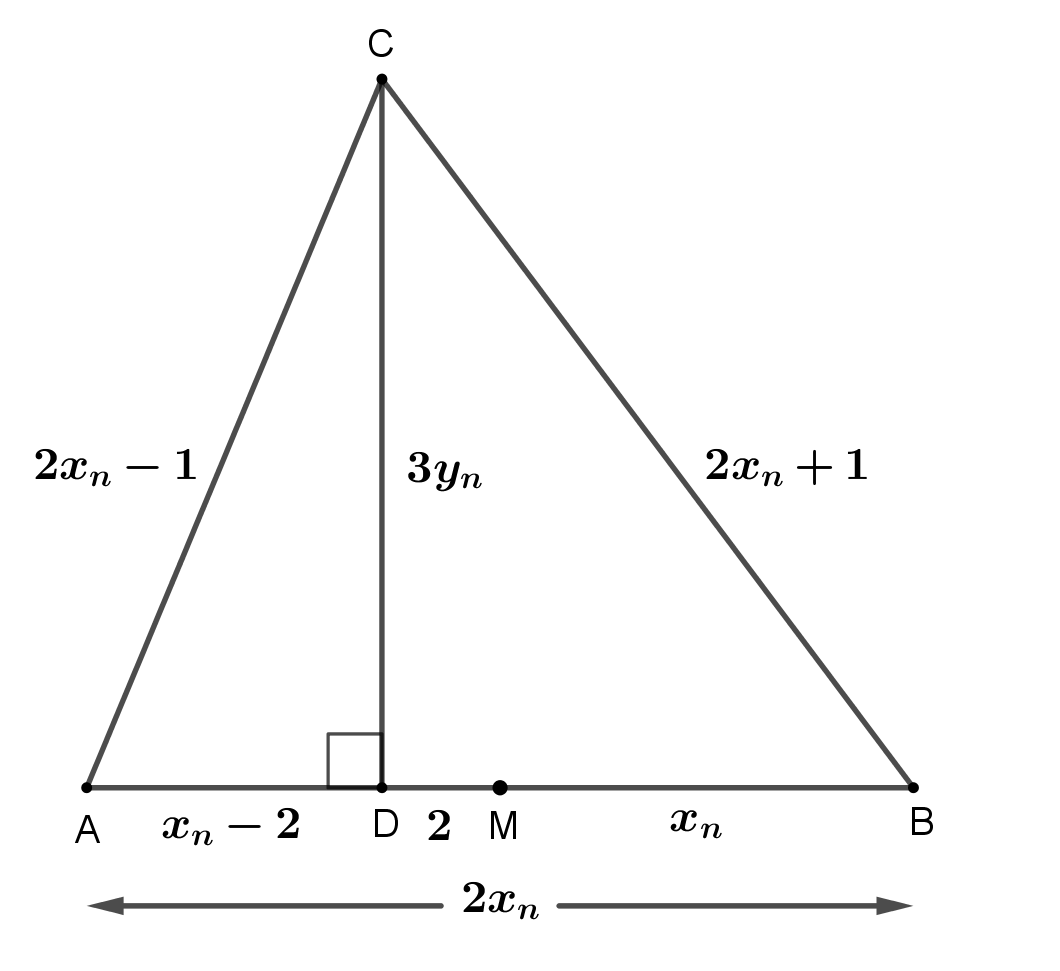
A Brahmagupta triangle where x_{n} and y_{n} are integers satisfying the equation $x_n^2-3y_n^2=1$.

Obviously x = 2, y = 1 is a solution of the equation x^{2} − 3y^{2} = 1. Taking this as an initial solution x_{1} = 2, y_{1} = 1, the set of all solutions {(x_{n}, y_{n})} of the equation can be generated using the following recurrence relations
$$\begin{align}
& x_{n+1} = 2x_n + 3y_n, && y_{n+1} = x_n + 2y_n, && n = 1,2,\ldots \\[2pt]
& \quad x_1 = 2. && \quad y_1 = 1.
\end{align}$$
or by the following relations with additional initial solutions x_{2} = 7, y_{2} = 4:
$$\begin{align}
& x_{n+1} = 4x_n - x_{n-1}, && y_{n+1} = 4y_n - y_{n-1}, && n = 2,3,\ldots \\[2pt]
& \quad x_1 = 2,\ x_2 = 7. && \quad y_1 = 1,\ y_2 = 4.
\end{align}$$

They can also be generated using the following property:
$$x_n+\sqrt{3} y_n = \left(x_1 + \sqrt{3}y_1 \right)^n, \quad n=1,2, \ldots$$
The following are the first eight values of x_{n} and y_{n} and the corresponding Brahmagupta triangles:

| n | 1 | 2 | 3 | 4 | 5 | 6 | 7 | 8 |
|---|---|---|---|---|---|---|---|---|
| x_{n} | 2 | 7 | 26 | 97 | 362 | 1351 | 5042 | 18817 |
| y_{n} | 1 | 4 | 15 | 56 | 209 | 780 | 2911 | 10864 |
| Brahmagupta triangle | 3,4,5 | 13,14,15 | 51,52,53 | 193,194,195 | 723,724,725 | 2701,2702,2703 | 10083,10084,10085 | 37633,37634,37635 |

The sequence {x_{n}} is entry A001075 in the Online Encyclopedia of Integer Sequences (OEIS) and the sequence {y_{n}} is entry A001353 in OEIS.

== Generalized Brahmagupta triangles ==
In a Brahmagupta triangle the side lengths form an integer arithmetic progression with a common difference 1. A generalized Brahmagupta triangle is a Heronian triangle in which the side lengths form an arithmetic progression of positive integers. Generalized Brahmagupta triangles can be easily constructed from Brahmagupta triangles. If $t-1, t, t+1$ are the side lengths of a Brahmagupta triangle then, for any positive integer $k$, the integers $k(t-1), kt, k(t+1)$ are the side lengths of a generalized Brahmagupta triangle which form an arithmetic progression with common difference $k$. There are generalized Brahmagupta triangles which are not generated this way. A primitive generalized Brahmagupta triangle is a generalized Brahmagupta triangle in which the side lengths have no common factor other than 1.

To find the side lengths of such triangles, let the side lengths be $t-d, t, t+d$ where $t,d$ are integers satisfying $1\le d\le t$. Using Heron's formula, the area $A$ of the triangle can be shown to be

$$A = \big(\tfrac{b}{4}\big)\sqrt{3(t^2-4d^2)}$$.

For $A$ to be an integer, $t$ must be even and one may take $t=2x$ for some integer. This makes

$$A=x\sqrt{3(x^2-d^2)}$$.

Since, again, $A$ has to be an integer, $x^2-d^2$ has to be in the form $3y^2$ for some integer $y$. Thus, to find the side lengths of generalized Brahmagupta triangles, one has to find solutions to the following homogeneous quadratic Diophantine equation:

$$x^2-3y^2=d^2$$.

It can be shown that all primitive solutions of this equation are given by

$$\begin{align}
d & = \vert m^2 - 3n^2\vert /g\\
x & = (m^2 + 3n^2)/g\\
y & = 2mn/g
\end{align}$$

where $m$ and $n$ are relatively prime positive integers and $g = \text{gcd}(m^2 - 3n^2, 2mn, m^2 + 3n^2)$.

If we take $m=n=1$ we get the Brahmagupta triangle $(3,4,5)$. If we take $m=2, n=1$ we get the Brahmagupta triangle $(13,14,15)$. But if we take $m=1, n=2$ we get the generalized Brahmagupta triangle $(15, 26, 37)$ which cannot be reduced to a Brahmagupta triangle.

== See also ==
- Brahmagupta polynomials
- Brahmagupta quadrilateral
