= Reinhold Hoppe =

German mathematician

Ernst Reinhold Eduard Hoppe (November 18, 1816 – May 7, 1900) was a German mathematician who worked as a professor at the University of Berlin.

== Education and career ==
Hoppe was a student of Johann August Grunert at the University of Greifswald, graduating in 1842 and becoming an English and mathematics teacher. He completed his doctorate in 1850 in Halle and his habilitation in mathematics in 1853 in Berlin under Peter Gustav Lejeune Dirichlet. He also tried to obtain a habilitation in philosophy at the same time, but was denied until a later re-application in 1871. He worked at Berlin as a privatdozent, and then after 1870 as a professor, but with few students and little remuneration.

When Grunert died in 1872, Hoppe took over the editorship of the mathematical journal founded by Grunert, the Archiv der Mathematik und Physik. Hoppe in turn continued as editor until his own death, in 1900. In 1890, Hoppe was one of the 31 founding members of the German Mathematical Society.

== Contributions ==
Hoppe wrote over 250 scientific publications, including one of the first textbooks on differential geometry.

His accomplishments in geometry include rediscovering the higher-dimensional regular polytopes (previously discovered by Ludwig Schläfli), and coining the term "polytope". In 1880 he published a closed-form expression for all triangles with consecutive integer sides and rational area, also known as almost-equilateral Heronian triangles. He is sometimes credited with having proven Isaac Newton's conjecture on the kissing number problem, that at most twelve congruent balls can touch a central ball of the same radius, but his proof was incorrect, and a valid proof was not found until 1953.

Hoppe published several works on a formula for the m-fold derivative of a composition of functions. The formula, now known as "Hoppe's formula", is a variation of Faà di Bruno's formula. Hoppe's publication of his formula in 1845 predates Faà di Bruno's in 1852, but is later than some other independent discoveries of equivalent formulas.

In his work on special functions, Hoppe belonged to the Königsberg school of thought, led by Carl Jacobi. He also published research in fluid mechanics.

== Awards and honors ==
He was elected to the Academy of Sciences Leopoldina in 1890.

== Books ==
- Theorie Der Independenten Darstellung Der Höhern Differentialquotienten (Leipzig: Joh. Ambr. Barth, 1845)
- Zulänglichkeit Des Empirismus In Der Philosophie (Berlin: Wilhelm Thome, 1852)
- Lehrbuch Der Differentialrechnung Und Reihentheorie Mit Strenger Begründung (Berlin: G. F. Otto Müller, 1865)
- Principien Der Flächentheorie (Leipzig: C. A. Koch, 1876)
- Tafeln Zur Dreissigstelligen Logarithmischen Rechnung (Leipzig: C. A. Koch, 1876)
- Lehrbuch Der Analytischen Geometrie (Leipzig: C. A. Koch, 1880)
