= Robbins pentagon =

Geometric figure

Unsolved problem in mathematics
Can a Robbins pentagon have irrational diagonals?
More unsolved problems in mathematics

A Robbins pentagon with area of 13,104

A Robbins pentagon with area of 7392

In geometry, a Robbins pentagon is a cyclic pentagon whose side lengths and area are all rational numbers.

== History ==
Robbins pentagons were named by Buchholz and MacDougall after David P. Robbins, who had previously given a formula for the area of a cyclic pentagon as a function of its edge lengths. Buchholz and MacDougall chose this name by analogy with the naming of Heron triangles after Hero of Alexandria, the discoverer of Heron's formula for the area of a triangle as a function of its edge lengths.

== Area and perimeter ==
Every Robbins pentagon may be scaled so that its sides and area are integers. More strongly, Buchholz and MacDougall showed that if the side lengths are all integers and the area is rational, then the area is necessarily also an integer, and the perimeter is necessarily an even number.

== Diagonals ==
Buchholz and MacDougall also showed that, in every Robbins pentagon, either all five of the internal diagonals are rational numbers or none of them are. If the five diagonals are rational (the case called a Brahmagupta pentagon by Sastry), then the radius of its circumscribed circle must also be rational, and the pentagon may be partitioned into three Heronian triangles by cutting it along any two non-crossing diagonals, or into five Heronian triangles by cutting it along the five radii from the circle center to its vertices.

Buchholz and MacDougall performed computational searches for Robbins pentagons with irrational diagonals but were unable to find any. On the basis of this negative result they suggested that Robbins pentagons with irrational diagonals may not exist.
