= Löschian number =

Number of the form x^2 + xy + y^2

- Named after: August Lösch
- Subsequence of: A032766
- Formula: x^{2} + xy + y^{2} for integer x, y
- First terms: 0, 1, 3, 4, 7, 9, 12, 13, 16
- OEIS index: A003136; Löschian numbers

In number theory, the numbers of the form x^{2} + xy + y^{2} for integer x, y are called the Löschian numbers (or Loeschian numbers). These numbers are named after August Lösch. They are the norms of the Eisenstein integers. They are a set of whole numbers, including zero, and having prime factorization in which all primes congruent to 2 mod 3 have even powers (there is no restriction of primes congruent to 0 or 1 mod 3).

== Properties ==
- Every Löschian number is nonnegative.
- Every square number is a Löschian number (by setting x or y to 0).
  - Moreover, every number of the form $(m^2+m+1)x^2$ for m and x integers is a Löschian number (by setting y=mx).
- There are infinitely many Löschian numbers.
- Given that odd and even integers are equally numerous, the probability that a Löschian number is odd is 0.75, and the probability that it is even is 0.25. This follows from the fact that $(x^2 + xy + y^2)$ is even if only x and y are both even.
- The greatest common divisor and the least common multiple of any two or more Löschian numbers are also Löschian numbers.
- The product of two Löschian numbers is always a Löschian number; in other words, Löschian numbers are closed under multiplication.
  - This property makes the set of Löschian numbers into a monoid under multiplication.
- The product of a Löschian number and a non-Löschian number is never a Löschian number.
