= Dual curve =

Curve in the dual projective plane made from all lines tangent to a given curve

Curves, dual to each other; see below for properties.

In projective geometry, a dual curve of a given plane curve C is a curve in the dual projective plane consisting of the set of lines tangent to C. There is a map from a curve to its dual, sending each point to the point dual to its tangent line. If C is algebraic then so is its dual and the degree of the dual is known as the class of the original curve. The equation of the dual of C, given in line coordinates, is known as the tangential equation of C. Duality is an involution: the dual of the dual of C is the original curve C.

The construction of the dual curve is the geometrical underpinning for the Legendre transformation in the context of Hamiltonian mechanics.

== Equations ==
Let f(x, y, z) = 0 be the equation of a curve in homogeneous coordinates on the projective plane. Let Xx + Yy + Zz = 0 be the equation of a line, with (X, Y, Z) being designated its line coordinates in a dual projective plane. The condition that the line is tangent to the curve can be expressed in the form F(X, Y, Z) = 0 which is the tangential equation of the curve.

At a point (p, q, r) on the curve, the tangent is given by

$$x\frac{\partial f}{\partial x}(p, q, r)+y\frac{\partial f}{\partial y}(p, q, r)+z\frac{\partial f}{\partial z}(p, q, r)=0.$$

So Xx + Yy + Zz = 0 is a tangent to the curve if

$$\begin{align}
X&=\lambda \frac{\partial f}{\partial x}(p, q, r),\\
Y&=\lambda \frac{\partial f}{\partial y}(p, q, r),\\
Z&=\lambda \frac{\partial f}{\partial z}(p, q, r).
\end{align}$$

Eliminating p, q, r, and λ from these equations, along with Xp + Yq + Zr = 0, gives the equation in X, Y and Z of the dual curve.

On the left: the ellipse (x/2)^{2} + (y/3)^{2} = 1 with tangent lines xX + yY = 1 for any X, Y, such that (2X)^{2} + (3Y)^{2} = 1. On the right: the dual ellipse (2X)^{2} + (3Y)^{2} = 1. Each tangent to the first ellipse corresponds to a point on the second one (marked with the same color).

=== Conic ===
For example, let C be the conic ax^{2} + by^{2} + cz^{2} = 0. The dual is found by eliminating p, q, r, and λ from the equations

$$\begin{array}{c}
X= 2\lambda ap, \ \ Y=2\lambda bq, \ \ Z=2\lambda cr,\\
Xp+Yq+Zr=0.
\end{array}$$

The first three equations are easily solved for p, q, r, and substituting in the last equation produces

$$\frac{X^2}{2\lambda a}+\frac{Y^2}{2\lambda b}+\frac{Z^2}{2\lambda c}=0.$$

Clearing 2λ from the denominators, the equation of the dual is

$$\frac{X^2}{a}+\frac{Y^2}{b}+\frac{Z^2}{c}=0.$$

=== General algebraic curve ===
Consider a parametrically defined curve $(x,y) = (x(t),y(t)),$ in projective coordinates $(x,y,z)=(x(t),y(t),1)$. Its projective tangent line is a linear plane spanned by the point of tangency and the tangent vector, with linear equation coefficients given by the cross product:

$(X,Y,Z) = (x,y,1)\times (x',y',0) = (-y',x',xy'-yx'),$

which in affine coordinates $(X,Y,1)$ is:

$$X=\frac{-y'}{xy'-yx'} , \quad
Y=\frac{x'}{xy'-yx'} .$$

The dual of an inflection point will give a cusp and two points sharing the same tangent line will give a self-intersection point on the dual.

=== Dual of the dual ===
From the projective description, one may compute the dual of the dual:

$(x(x'y''-y'x''),\, y(x'y''-y'x''),\, x'y''-y'x'') = (x, \, y,\, 1)(x'y''-y'x''),$

which is projectively equivalent to the original curve $(x(t),y(t),1)$.

== Properties ==
Properties of the original curve correspond to dual properties on the dual curve. In the Introduction image, the red curve has three singularities – a node in the center, and two cusps at the lower right and lower left. The black curve has no singularities but has four distinguished points: the two top-most points correspond to the node (double point), as they both have the same tangent line, hence map to the same point in the dual curve, while the two inflection points correspond to the cusps, since the tangent lines first go one way then the other (slope increasing, then decreasing).

By contrast, on a smooth, convex curve the angle of the tangent line changes monotonically, and the resulting dual curve is also smooth and convex.

Further, both curves above have a reflectional symmetry: projective duality preserves symmetries a projective space, so dual curves have the same symmetry group. In this case both symmetries are realized as a left-right reflection; this is an artifact of how the space and the dual space have been identified – in general these are symmetries of different spaces.

== Degree ==
If X is a plane algebraic curve, then the degree of the dual is the number of points in the intersection with a line in the dual plane. Since a line in the dual plane corresponds to a point in the plane, the degree of the dual is the number of tangents to the X that can be drawn through a given point. The points where these tangents touch the curve are the points of intersection between the curve and the polar curve with respect to the given point. If the degree of the curve is d then the degree of the polar is d − 1 and so the number of tangents that can be drawn through the given point is at most d(d − 1).

The dual of a line (a curve of degree 1) is an exception to this and is taken to be a point in the dual space (namely the original line). The dual of a single point is taken to be the collection of lines though the point; this forms a line in the dual space which corresponds to the original point.

If X is smooth (no singular points) then the dual of X has maximum degree d(d − 1). This implies the dual of a conic is also a conic. Geometrically, the map from a conic to its dual is one-to-one (since no line is tangent to two points of a conic, as that requires degree 4), and the tangent line varies smoothly (as the curve is convex, so the slope of the tangent line changes monotonically: cusps in the dual require an inflection point in the original curve, which requires degree 3).

For curves with singular points, these points will also lie on the intersection of the curve and its polar and this reduces the number of possible tangent lines. The Plücker formulas give the degree of the dual in terms of d and the number and types of singular points of X.

== Polar reciprocal ==
The dual can be visualized as a locus in the plane in the form of the polar reciprocal. This is defined with reference to a fixed conic Q as the locus of the poles of the tangent lines of the curve C. The conic Q is nearly always taken to be a circle, so the polar reciprocal is the inverse of the pedal of C.

== Generalizations ==
=== Higher dimensions ===
Similarly, generalizing to higher dimensions, given a hypersurface, the tangent space at each point gives a family of hyperplanes, and thus defines a dual hypersurface in the dual space. For any closed subvariety X in a projective space, the set of all hyperplanes tangent to some point of X is a closed subvariety of the dual of the projective space, called the dual variety of X.

Examples

- If X is a hypersurface defined by a homogeneous polynomial F(x_{0}, ..., x_{n}), then the dual variety of X is the image of X by the gradient map

$$x=(x_0,\ldots, x_n)\mapsto \left(\frac{\partial F}{\partial x_0}(x),\ldots, \frac{\partial F}{\partial x_n}(x)\right)$$

which lands in the dual projective space.

- The dual variety of a point (a_{0} : ... : a_{n}) is the hyperplane

$$a_0x_0+\ldots +a_nx_n=0.$$

=== Dual polygon ===
The dual curve construction works even if the curve is piecewise linear or piecewise differentiable, but the resulting map is degenerate (if there are linear components) or ill-defined (if there are singular points).

In the case of a polygon, all points on each edge share the same tangent line, and thus map to the same vertex of the dual, while the tangent line of a vertex is ill-defined, and can be interpreted as all the lines passing through it with angle between the two edges. This accords both with projective duality (lines map to points, and points to lines), and with the limit of smooth curves with no linear component: as a curve flattens to an edge, its tangent lines map to closer and closer points; as a curve sharpens to a vertex, its tangent lines spread further apart.

More generally, any convex polyhedron or cone has a polyhedral dual, and any convex set X with boundary hypersurface H has a convex conjugate X* whose boundary is the dual variety H*.

== See also ==
- Hough transform
- Gauss map
