= Plane cubic curve =

Type of mathematical curve

Singular cubic y^{2} = x^{2} (x + 1).

A selection of cubic curves

In mathematics, a plane cubic curve, often called simply a cubic, is a plane algebraic curve defined by a homogeneous polynomial of degree 3 in three variables $F(X, Y, Z)$ or by the corresponding polynomial in two variables $f(x,y)=F(X, Y, 1).$ Starting from $f$, one can recover $F$ as $F(X,Y,Z)=Z^3 f(X/Z,Y/Z)$.

More generally, a cubic curve (not necessarily plane) is an algebraic curve of degree 3. Every cubic curve that is not contained in a plane can be transformed into the twisted cubic by a suitable projective transformation. Therefore, non-plane cubic curves are not considered further in this article.

Typically, the coefficients of the polynomial defining a plane cubic curve belong to $\R,$ but they may belong to any field $k$, in which case, one talks of a cubic defined over $k$. The points of the cubic are the points of the projective space of dimension three over the field of the complex numbers (or over an algebraic closure of $k$), whose projective coordinates satisfy the equation of the cubic
$$F(X,Y,Z)=0.$$
A point at infinity of the cubic is a point such that $Z=0$. A real point of the cubic is a point with real coordinates. A point defined over $k$ is a point with coordinates in $k$.

Generally, the defining polynomial is implicitly assumed to be irreducible, since, otherwise, the equation defines either three lines (not necessarily distinct), or a conic section and a line. However, it is often convenient to include the decomposed curves into the cubics. When the distinction is needed, one talks of irreducible cubics and decomposed cubics (or degenerated cubics).

== Basics ==
A cubic plane curve, or simply a cubic is basically the set of the points in the Euclidean plane whose Cartesian coordinates are zeros of a polynomial of degree 3 in two variables:
$$f(x,y)=a_0+a_1x +a_2 y +a_3x^2 +a_4xy +a_5y^2 +a_6x^3 +a_7x^2y +a_8xy^2 +a_9y^3$$

Typically, the coefficients $a_i$are real numbers, and the points of the cubic are real zeros of $f$. The nonreal complex zeros of $f$ are also considered as points of the cubic, and the points in the Euclidean plane are called real points of the cubic to distinguish them from the nonreal ones.

It is common and often needed for technical reasons to extend the cubic defined by $f$ to the projective plane, by considering as points of the cubic the points of the projective plane whose projective coordinates satisfy $F(X,Y,Z)=0$, where
$$F(X,Y,Z)=a_0Z^3+a_1XZ^2 +a_2 YZ^2 +a_3X^2Z +a_4XYZ +a_5Y^2Z +a_6X^3 +a_7X^2Y +a_8XY^2 +a_9Y^3.$$
The points of the Euclidean plane are identified with the points of the projective plane with $Z\ne 0$ by the relation $x=X/Z, y=Y/Z$. The points of the cubic such that $Z=0$ are called the points at infinity of the cubic.

Everything that precedes applies by replacing the field $\R$ of the real numbers with any field $k$, the Euclidean plane with an affine plane over $k$, the complex numbers with an algebraically closed field $K$ containing $k$, "real point" with "point defined over $k$" or "$k$-point", etc.

A cubic is degenerated or decomposed if the polynomial $f$ (equivalently $F$) is not absolutely irreducible. In this case, either there is an irreducible factor of degree 2 and the cubic is decomposed into a conic and a line, or there are three linear factors corresponding to the decomposition of the cubic into three lines that are not necessarily distinct. A non-degenerated cubic is called an irreducible cubic.

In the projective plane over the algebraically closed field $K$, every line intersects the cubic in three points, not necessarily distinct (an exception occurs if the line is a component of a decomposed cubic).

=== Tangents and singular points ===
The equation of the tangent at a point of projective coordinates $X_0, Y_0, Z_0$ on the cubic is
$$XF_X'(X_0, Y_0, Z_0) +YF'_Y(X_0, Y_0, Z_0)+ZF'_Z(X_0, Y_0, Z_0) =0.$$
If all three partial derivatives at $(X_0, Y_0, Z_0)$ are equal to zero, the tangent is undefined, and the point is a singular point.

An irreducible cubic has at most one singular point, since otherwise the line passing through two singular points would intersect the cubic at four points (counting multiplicities, which are at least 2 for singular points).

The singular points of a decomposed cubic are the intersection points of two components, and, if any, all points of a multiple component.

If an irreducible cubic has a singular point of projective coordinates $(X_0:Y_0:Z_0)$,the tangent cone consists of two lines that are distinct of not. If the tangent cone is a double line, the singular point is a cusp. Otherwise, it is an ordinary double point.

Over the reals, such an ordinary point may be either a crunode if the two tangent lines are real, or an acnode if they are complex conjugate. When the real points of the curve are plotted, an acnode appear as an isolated point, a crunode appears as a point where the curve crosses itself, and a cusp appears a point where a moving point must reverse direction.

=== Inflection points ===
An inflection point is a regular point of a curve where the tangent has a contact of order at least 3, and thus exactly 3 in the case of cubic curves. The inflection points of an algebraic plane curve are common zeros of the projective equation of the curve
$$F(X,Y,Z)=0$$
and the Hessian determinant
$$H(X,Y,Z)=\begin{vmatrix}
F''_{XX}& F''_{XY} &F''_{XZ}\\
F''_{YX}& F''_{YY} &F''_{YZ}\\
F''_{ZX}& F''_{ZY} &F''_{ZZ}\\
\end{vmatrix}.$$

In the case of a cubic, both polynomials are of degree 3, and by Bézout's theorem, there are at most 9 inflexion points over an algebraic closure of the field of definition of the cubic. More precisely, the common zeros are the inflection points are the common zeros. The inflection points are the common zeros of multiplicity one, and the singular points, if any, are the common zeros of higher multiplicity.

A cubic with a cusp has exactly one inflection point. A cubic with an ordinary double point has three colinear inflection points; over the reals, the three inflection points are real if the singular point is an acnode; if it is a crunode, there is a real inflection point and two complex conjugate ones. A non-singular cubic has 9 inflection points that have a special configuration (see below); over the reals, exactly 3 of the inflection points are real, and they are colinear.

== Real shapes ==
Real cubics may have many shapes in a Euclidean plane.

In Weierstrass normal form
$$y^2 =x^3+ax+b,$$
their shape depends from the parameters $a$ and $b$, and, more specifically on the signs of $a$, $b$, and $4a^3+27b^2$:

- If $4a^3+27b^2=0$, the cubic is singular.
  - If $4a^3+27b^2=a=0$, the singular point is a cusp.
  - If $4a^3+27b^2=0$ and $b<0$ there is a acnode.
  - If $4a^3+27b^2=0$ and $b>0$ there is a crunode.
- If $4a^3+27b^2>0$, the cubic is non-singular and has a single unbounded branch; the sign of $a$ determines whether there are tangents parallel to the $x$-axis.
- If $4a^3+27b^2<0$, the cubic is non-singular, and has an unbounded branch and an "oval" (closed curve).
Non-singular cubics in Weierstrass form

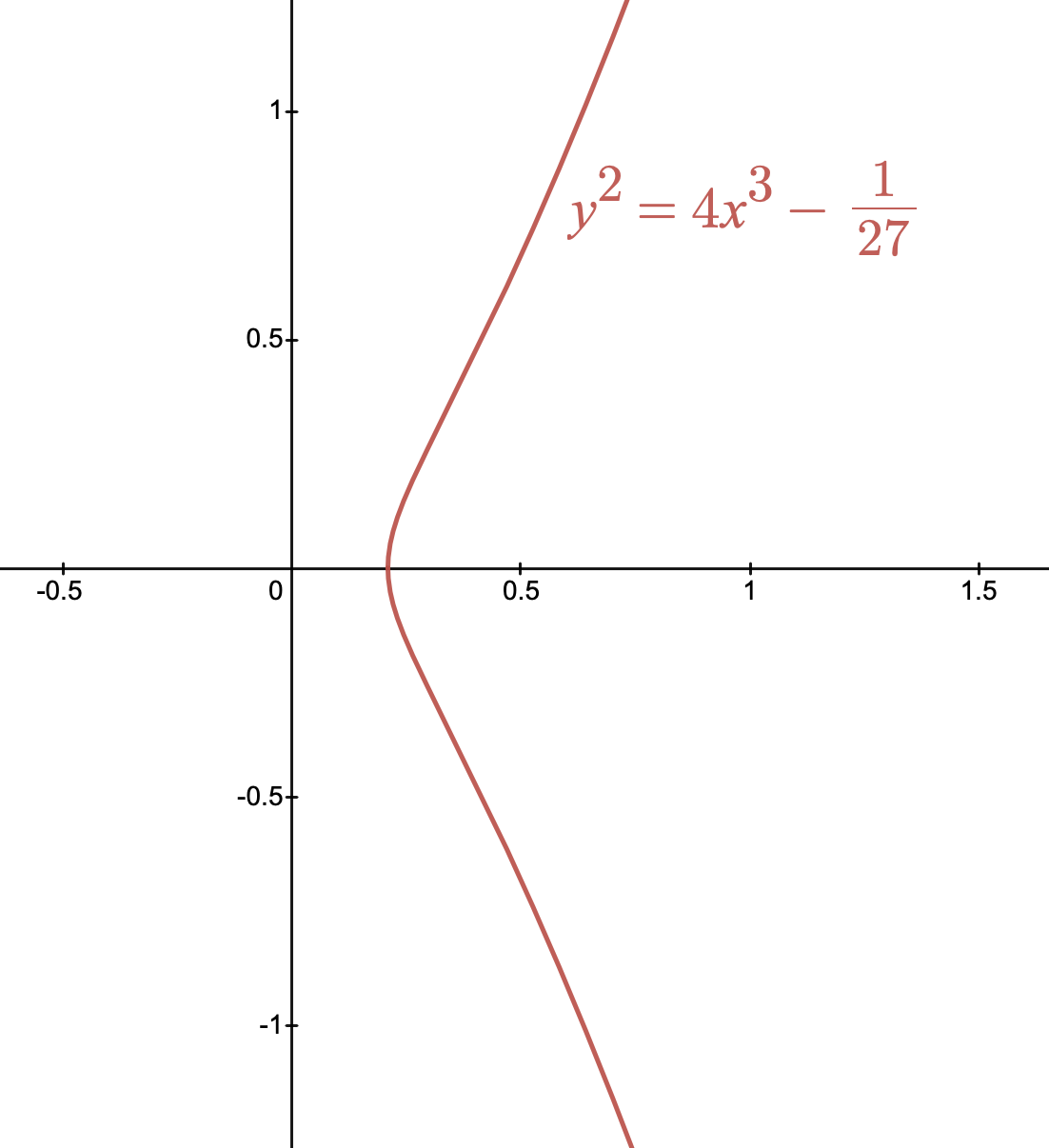
One branch without horizontal tangent

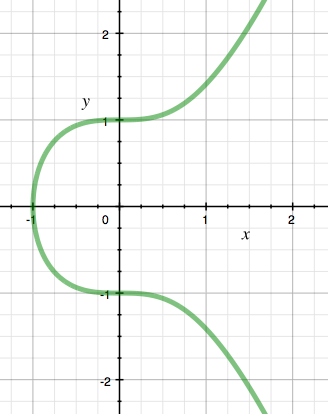
One branch with horizontal inflections (Mordell curve)
y^{2} = x^{3} + 1

One branch with horizontal tangents

Two branches
y^{2} = x^{3} − x

In the following plots, the singular point is placed at the origin. Except for the semicubical parabola, a translation of 1/3 to the left or to the right is needed for having a true Weierstrass form.

Singular cubics in Weierstrass form

Isolated point
y^{2} = x^{3} − x^{2}

semicubical parabola
y^{2} = x^{3}

Double point
y^{2} = x^{3} + x^{2}

For the cubics that are not in Weierstrass normal form, the shape depends on the shape of the corresponding Weierstrass form and on the configuration of the intersection with the line at infinity.

Singular cubics

Isolated point at the origin
x^{3} + y^{3} = x^{2} + y^{2}

Folium of Descartes
y^{3} + x^{3} − 3xy = 0

Trident curve
Double point at infinity
xy = 1 - x − x^{2} − x^{3}

Graph of a cubic function
Cusp at infinity

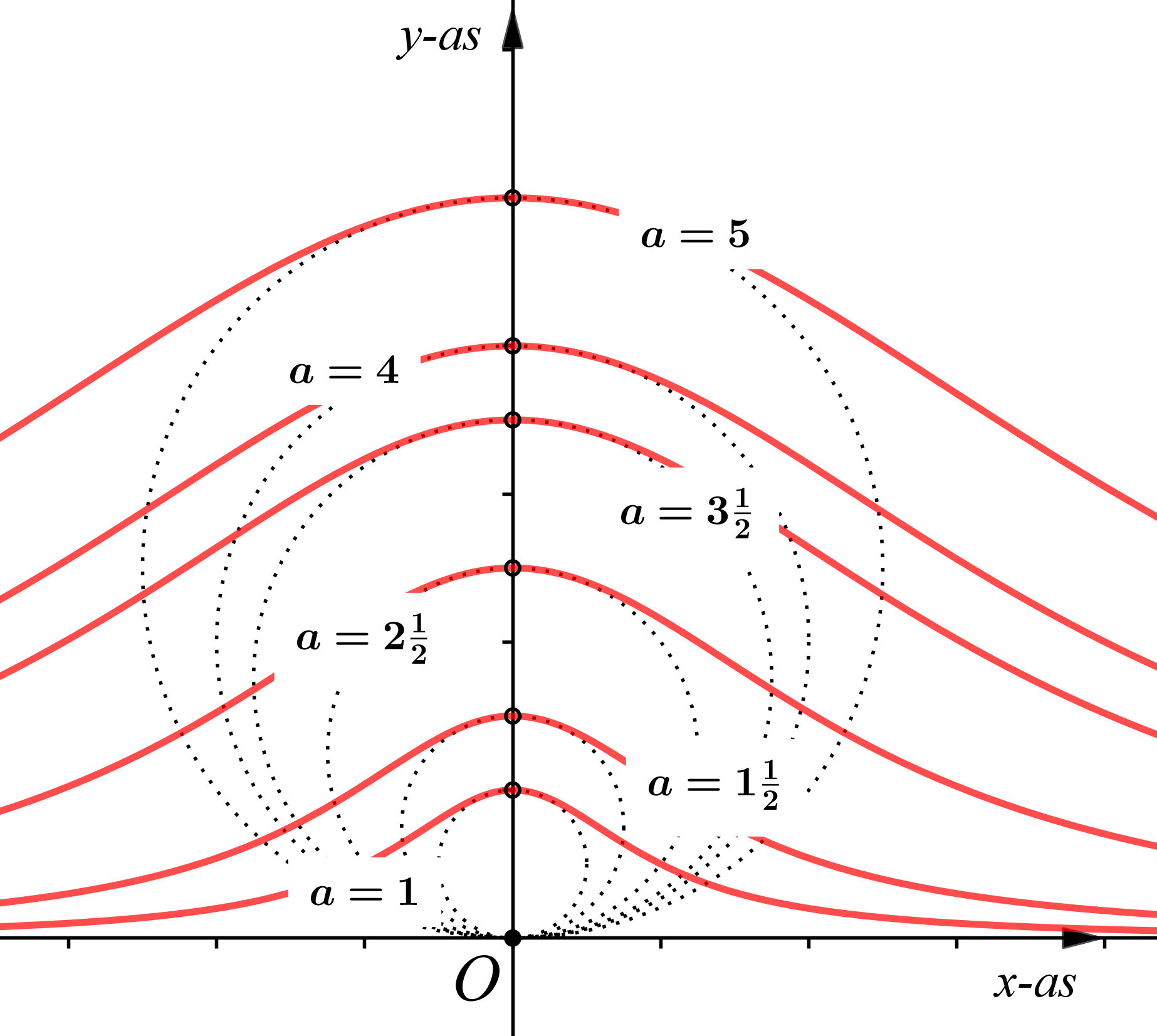
Witch of Agnesi
Isolated point at infinity on the y-axis
y(x^{2} + a^{2}) = a^{3}
Elliptic cubics

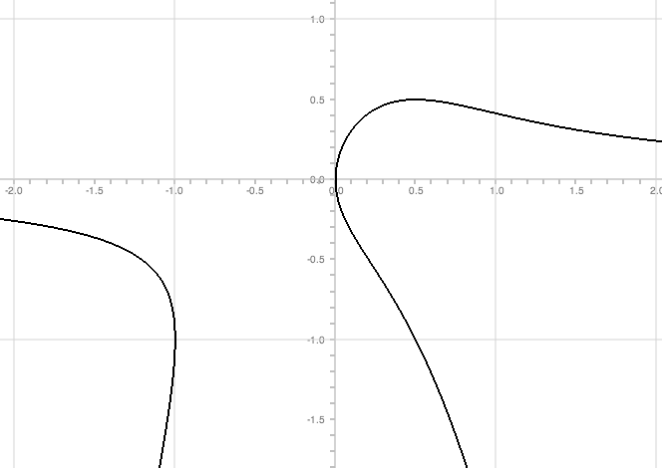
One projective oval
2x^{2}y + y^{2} = x

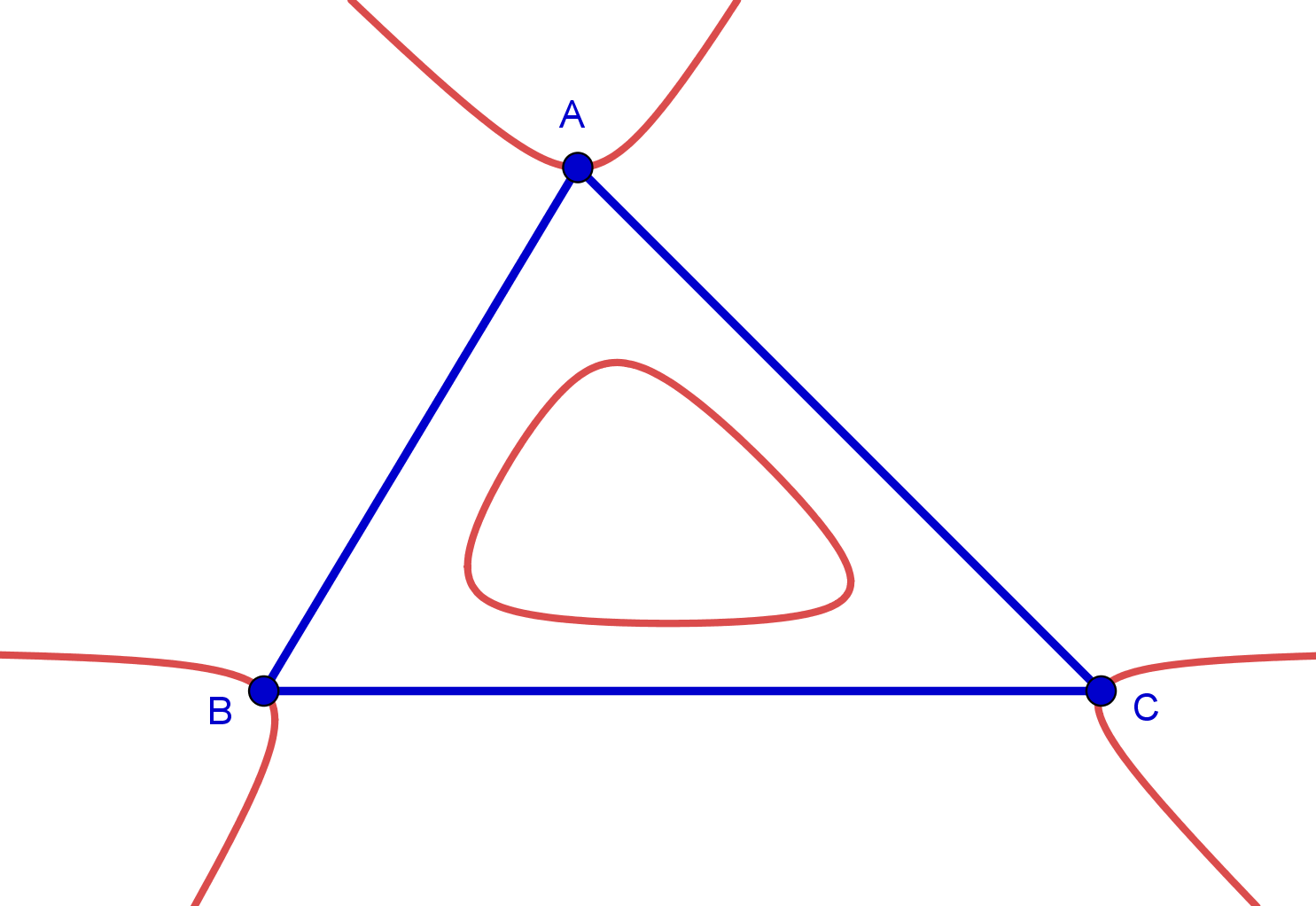
Two projective ovals
Tucker cubic (red)

== Singular cubics ==
An irreducible cubic is said to be singular if it has a singular point in the projective plane, even if it has none in the Euclidean plane.

In particular, the graph of a cubic function $y=ax^3+bx^2+cx+d$ is regular in the Euclidean plane but has a singular point at infinity in the direction of the y-axis (the point of projective coordinates $(0:1:0)$). This point is a cusp with the line at infinity as its double tangent. Other examples of singular cubics that are regular in the Euclidean plane are the trident curve with a double point at infinity and the witch of Agnesi with an isolated point at infinity. All these cubics are special cases of the singular cubics of equation $yp(x)=q(x)$, where $p$ and $q$ are polynomials in $x$ such that $\max(\deg (q), 1+\deg (p))=3$.

Examples of cubics that have a double point in the Euclidean plane are the folium of Descartes, the Tschirnhausen cubic, and the trisectrix of Maclaurin. Example with a cusp are the semicubical parabola and the cissoid of Diocles. The curve $y^2=x^3-x^2$ is an example having an isolated point at the origin.

Singular cubics are also called unicursal cubics, because a moving point travelling the cubic can cover the whole cubic in a single course (except, the isolated double point, if there is one). They are the rational cubics, that is the cubics that admit a rational parametrization, a parametrization in terms of rational functions.

Indeed, the lines passing through the singular point depend on a single parameter, which can be the slope in the Euclidean plane. The three intersection points of the cubic and such a line consist of twice the singular point and a single other point whose coordinate can be obtained by solving a linear equation.

More precisely, given a singular conic, one may change coordinates for having the singular point at the origin. Then the equation of the cubic has the form $c(x,y)-q(x,y)=0,$ where $c$ and $q$ are homogeneous polynomials of respective degrees 3 and 2. Setting $y=tx$, one gets
$$c(x,tx)-q(x,y)=x^2(xc(1,t)-q(1,t)),$$
giving the parametric equation
$$x=\frac{q(1,t)}{c(1,t)},\qquad
y=\frac{tq(1,t)}{c(1,t)}.$$
If desired, one can make back the change of coordinates for having the parametrization in terms of the original coordinates.

Conversely, if $q_0(t)$, $q_1(t)$, and $q_2(t)$ are three polynomials without a common factor, that have 3 as their maximal degree, then the parametric equation
$$x=\frac{q_1(t)}{q_0(t)},\qquad
y=\frac{q_2(t)}{q_0(t)}$$
defines a singular cubic whose implicit equation can be obtained as the resultant
$$\operatorname{Res}_t(xq_0(t)-q_1(t),yq_0(t)-q_2(t)) .$$

== Weierstrass normal form ==
Over a field of characteristic different from 2 and 3, every irreducible cubic can be transformed into the Weierstrass normal form
$$y^2=x^3+ax^2+bx+c$$
by a projective transformation, or equivalently by a change of projective coordinates. The parameters $a$ and $b$ may belong to the field of definition of the cubic even if the projective transformation may require to work over an algebraic extension of the field of definition. Over the real numbers, a real projective transformation is always possible.

For this change of coordinates one can proceed as follows.

Firstly, choose an inflection point and a projective coordinate system such that the inflection point is at infinity in the direction of the $y$-axis (that is the point $(0:1:0)$), with the line at infinity as its tangent. Over the real, there is always a real inflexion point, and the projective transformation is real. Over other fields, it may be that an algebraic field extension is needed. The resulting equation has the form
$$ax^3+bx^2+cx+d=ey^2+fxy +gy.$$
One has $a\ne 0$, since, otherwise, the line at infinity would be a component of the curve. One has also $e\ne 0$, since otherwise, the point $(0:1:0)$ would be a singular point and thus not an inflexion point.

The transformation $(x\mapsto aex, \quad y\mapsto a^2ex)$ and the division of the whole equation by $a^4e^2$ allows supposing $a=e=1$. The transformation $y\mapsto y-(fx+g)/2$ gives $f=g=0$ (variant of completing the square). Finally, the transformation $x\mapsto x-b/3$ (depressing the cubic) gives the Weierstrass normal form.

The Weierstrass normal form is not unique since the transformation $(x\mapsto x/\lambda^2, \quad y\mapsto y/\lambda^3)$ and the multiplication of the whole equation by $\lambda^6$ amounts to multiply the coefficient of $x$ and the constant coefficient by $\lambda^4$ and $\lambda^6$ respectively.

The invariant theory (see below) shows that no other Weierstrass normal forms exist for a given cubic, even if one changes the initial choice of an inflection point. Moreover, even if the inflexion point is not defined over the field of definition of the cubic, one can choose $\lambda$ for getting a Weierstrass normal form with coefficients in the field of definition of the cubic.

=== Invariant theory ===
Invariant theory is mainly concerned with the study of invariants of homogeneous polynomials, called forms in this context, under the action of the projective special linear group (PSL) on the variables. An invariant for the forms of degree $d$ in $n$ variables is a polynomial with integer coefficients whose indeterminates are the coefficients of a generic form, which is left invariant under the action of $\operatorname{PSL}(n)$ on the variables of the form. For, example, if $d=n=2$ (binary quadratic forms), the generic form is
$$ax^2+bxy+cy^2$$
and the discriminant $b^2-4ac$ is an invariant that is essentially unique, since all invariants are polynomials in the discriminant.

Here we are concerned with ternary cubic forms, that is, homogeneous polynomials of degree 3 in 3 variables. Invariants are thus polynomials in 10 variables. The invariants form a ring $\Z[S,T]$ where $S$ and $T$ are homogeneous polynomials in 10 variables of respective degrees 4 and 6. The invariant $4S^3+27Q^2$, of degree 12 is called the discriminant of the cubic.

Given the Weierstrass normal form of an irreducible cubic, one can choose the above coefficient $\lambda$ for having the Weierstrass normal form
$$y^2=x_3+g_2x+g_3,$$
where $g_2$ and $g_3$ are the value of the invariants $S$ and $T$ at the coefficients of the original cubic.

This shows that the Weierstrass normal form does not depends on the choice of an inflexion point and its coefficients may always be chosen in the field $k$ generated by the coefficients of the cubic. However, if there is no inflexion point defined on $k$, the $k$-points of the Weierstrass normal form are not the same as those of the original cubic.

== Through given points ==
An equation of a cubic in the projective plane has the form
$$a_0x^3 +a_1 y^3 +a_2 z^3 +a_3  x^2 y +a_4 x^2 z +a_5 y^2 x+a_6 y^2 z+a_7 z^2 x+a_8 z^2 y+a_9 xyz=0,$$
and the other equations of the same cubic can be obtained by multiplying all coefficients by the same scalar. Since there are 10 coefficients, the cubics form a projective space of dimension 9.

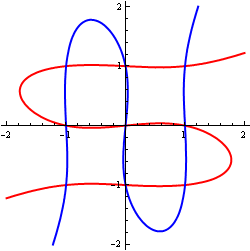
Two cubic curves through the nine points of a 3 × 3 grid

Passing through a given point induces a linear constraint on the coefficients of a cubic. This means that the cubics passing through a given point form a hyperplane in the projective space of the cubics. Thus, for $n\le 9$, the set of the cubics passing through $n$ given points is a projective space of dimension is at least $9- n$, and it follows that there is at least one cubic (possibly degenerated) passing through nine given points. In general, there is only one such cubic, but, for some point configurations there can be many. For example, if the 9 points are on the same line, all decomposed cubics having this line as a component pass through these 9 points.

This is to compare with the fact that two points define a line that is unique if and only if the points are distinct, and five points define a conic if and only if no four of them are colinear. The main difference here is that there is no simple characterization of the configurations of 9 points through which pass several cubics. If two cubics pass through nine given points, then all linear combinations of their equations define a cubic passing through the points, forming a pencil of cubics, that is, a line in the projective space of the cubics.

By Bézout's theorem, two cubics intersect in nine points (counted with their multiplicity, over an algebraically closed field). This seems in contradiction with the above result that, in general, nine points define a unique cubic. This apparent contradiction, called Cramer's paradox, means that the nine intersection points of two cubics are not in general position.

There is no simple characterization of the general position of nine points, but the Cayley–Bacharach theorem characterizes the general position of eight points: eight points are in general position if no line passes through four of them and no conic passes through seven of them. This implies that the cubics passing through the eight points form a pencil (projective line), and that all cubics passing through these eight points pass through a unique 9th point. Given the coordinates of the eight points, linear algebra allows computing this 9th point. Thus every other 9th point provides nine points in general position.

== Group of the points ==
In this section, a fixed non-singular cubic is considered, which is defined over a field $k$ and has an inflection point. denoted $O$ that is also defined over $k$. The line passing through two equal points of the cubic is defined as the tangent line to the cubic at the point.

One of the main properties of a non-singular cubic, is that, under the above hypotheses, the $k$-points of the cubic (points defined over $k$) form an abelian group, defined as follows. The identity element is the point $O$. the opposite $-P$ of a point $P$ is the third intersection point of the curve and the line $OP$. Given two points $P$ and $Q$, their sum $P+Q$ is the opposite of the third intersection point of the curve and the line $OP$.

This operation is closed on the $k$-points. Indeed, the equation of the line passing through two $k$-points of the cubic has coefficients belonging to $k$. The intersection of such a line and the cubic leads to a cubic equation with coefficients in $k$, which has two roots in $k$, corresponding to the starting points. Factoring out these two known roots gives a linear equation with coefficients in $k$, giving a solution in $k$, and therefore a $k$-point.

All group axioms, but associativity result immediately from the definitions. the proof of associativity is more complicated.

If the cubic is in Weierstrass normal form
$$y^2=x^3+ax+b,$$
the chosen inflection point is the point at infinity in the direction of the $y$-axis (point of projective coordinates $x=0, y=1, t=0$). It follows that for every point $P$ of the cubic, $P$ and $-P$ are symmetric with respect to the $x$-axis.

The group law is defined as follow: the identity element $O$ is the chosen inflection point. For every point $P$, the additive inverse $-P$ is the third intersection point of the curve and the line passing through $O$ and $P$. Given two points $P$ and $Q$, their sum $P+Q$ is the additive inverse of the third intersection point of the curve and the line passing through $P$ and $Q$. In what precedes, the line passing through two equal points of the curve is the tangent to the curve at the point, and if a line is tangent to the curve, two of the intersection points are equal (three, if the point is an inflection point).

The group of the $k$-points of a non-singular cubic has been widely studied. Mordell–Weil theorem establish that it is finitely generated when $k$ is an algebraic number field.

If $k$ is a finite field the group is evidently finite, but its order is difficult to estimate exactly (in general, only approximations can be given). It follows that given a point $P$, it is difficult to find a point $Q$ such that $P=nQ$, Where $nQ$ is the sum of $n$ copies of $Q$. This is widely used in public-key cryptography.

== Hesse configuration ==
The Hesse configuration Four of the 12 lines are curved since the configuration has no representation in the real plane where all lines are straight lines.

Over an algebraically closed field, the nine inflexion points of a nonsingular cubic have a particular configuration, called Hesse configuration.

Denoting $2P=P+P$ and $3P=P+P+P$, the inflection points of a cubic are exactly the points such that $3P=O$. So, if $P$ and $Q$ are inflexion points, $P+Q$ is also an inflection point, and the inflexion points form a vector space over the field $\mathbb F_3$ with three elements, where lines passing through three inflection points correspond to affine lines in this vector space. So the inflexion points form a configuration of 9 points and 12 lines, such that each line passes through exactly 3 points, and each point belongs to exactly 4 lines. By Sylvester–Gallai theorem, the 9 inflexion points cannot be all real.

The Hesse configuration consists of 9 points of the complex projective plane that realize the above configuration in the complex projective plane. These points are the points whose projective coordinates are $(0: 1: \zeta)$ or a circular permutation of it, where $\zeta$ an any root of the polynomial $x^3+1$.

The points of the Hesse configuration are often presented on a 3 by 3 grid as follows, where $\xi$ is a root of $x^2-x+1$:
$$\begin{matrix}
(0:1:-1) & (-1:0:1)  &(1:-1:0)\\
(0:1:\xi)& (\xi:0:1) &(1:\xi:0)\\
(0:\xi:1)& (1:0:\xi) &(\xi:1:0)
\end{matrix}$$
The lines passing though these points are represented on the figure.

For every real nonsingular cubic, there is a real projective transformation that maps the inflection points of the cubic onto the Hesse configuration, resulting in the projective equation
$$X^3+Y^3+Z^3=3\,kXYZ,$$
called the Hesse normal form of the cubic.

Conversely, if the equation of a cubic has this form, the cubic is nonsingular if and only if $k\ne 1$. If $k= 1$,the point $(1:1:1)$ is an isolated singular point. If $k> 1$, the curve consists of two "ovals" (connected components in the real projective plane); if $k< 1$, the curve consists of a single oval.

Given a nonsingular cubic in Hesse normal form, the Weierstrass normal form $y^2=x^3+ax+b$ can be obtained by taking as line at infinity the line $Y+Z-kX=0$. The parameters $a$ and $b$ are rational functions of $k$. It follows that, every rational function of $a$ and $b$ is also a rational function of $k$, which provides an equation in $k$, by clearing denominators. Such an equation is given by the $J$-invariant
$$J=\frac{4a^3}{4a^3+27b^2}=\left(\frac{k^4+8k}{4k^3-4}\right)^3,$$
which gives an equation of degree 12 in $k$. This allows recovering the parameter $k$ of the Hessian normal form from the parameters $a$ and $b$ of the Weierstrass normal form.

In the case of a real cubic, exactly two of these 12 values of $k$ are real, corresponding to the two possible signs of $b$, or, if $b=0$, to the two possible signs of $a$. In other words, real nonsingular cubics are characterized, up to a real projective transformation, by the parameter $k$ or their Hessian normal form.

== Projective classification ==
As discussed above, the cubic curves in a projective plane over any field form a nine-dimensional projective space. However, the space of projective transformations of the plane containing these curves has only eight degrees of freedom (the nine coefficients of a linear transformation on homogenous coordinates, minus one for scalar equivalences), so there is a one-dimensional family of cubic curves that are inequivalent under projective transformations.

Any non-singular cubic curve (over a field of characteristic $\notin\{2,3\}$) can be transformed by projective transformation into either of two canonical forms, the Hesse normal form $x^3+y^3+z^3=3kxyz$ (for a single coefficient $k$, a curve in the Hesse pencil), or the standard normal form or Weierstrass normal form $y^2=x^3+ax+b$ (for two coefficients $a$ and $b$). Every non-singular cubic curve can be placed into Hesse form, and every irreducible cubic curve with an inflection point can be placed into standard normal form, with the inflection point at infinity.

Curves in the Hesse pencil of cubic curves $x^3+y^3+z^3=3kxyz$, as seen in a symmetric view of the projective plane in which the lines $x,y,z=0$ form an equilateral triangle with the point 1:1:1 at its center, and the line $x+y+z=0$ forms the line at infinity. Different colors represent different curves in the pencil, corresponding to different choices of the parameter $k$: The three black lines forming an equilateral triangle represent the degenerate case $xyz=0$ corresponding to $k=\infty$.; The black point in the center is an isolated point from the degenerate case $k=1$. It has as its roots the point 1:1:1 (shown, from a quadratic factor) and the line at infinity (not shown, from a linear factor).; The blue and green curves represent choices of $k$ with $k>1$, forming two ovals in the real projective plane: a central oval inside the equilateral triangle, and an external oval with three inflection points at infinity, separating it into three real branches. The choices of $k$ for the blue curves are (from lighter to darker) 36, 12, 6, 4, and 3. For the green curves, only the central oval is visible; their parameters are (from lighter to darker) 2, 1.5, 1.25, and 1.1; The red curves represent choices of $k$ with $k<1$, having only a single oval with the same three inflection points and three real branches. Their choices of $k$ are (from lighter to darker) –8, –2, –1, –0.5, 0.

In the real case, the non-singular cubics are completely classified by the real coefficient $k$ of the Hesse normal form. Curves in this form reduce to an isolated point and a line when $k=1$, and are nonsingular when $k\ne 1$; in the limit as $k\to\infty$ they degenerate to a reducible cubic with three lines. Real curves with $k>1$ have two projective components and with $k<1$ they have one component. Two non-singular cubics are projectively equivalent if and only if they have the same Hesse normal form. The same curves are almost completely classified by the j-invariant of the standard normal form,
$$J=\frac{4a^3}{4a^3+27b^2}=\left(\frac{k^4+8k}{4k^3-4}\right)^3,$$
a number that remains unchanged between projectively equivalent curves in different standard normal forms: each real number is the j-invariant of two different non-singular real cubic curves. These curves differ from each other in the sign of $b$ or, if $b=0$, in the sign of $a$. They are equivalent under complex projective transformations, but not under real projective transformations.

In the complex case, the non-singular cubics are completely classified by the j-invariant: every complex number is the j-invariant of a cubic curve, and two non-singular cubic curves are projectively equivalent if and only if they have the same j-invariant. The case for the coefficient $k$ of the Hesse normal form is more complicated. The curve is singular when $k^3=1$, or for the reducible cubic $xyz=0$ which can be interpreted as the Hesse normal form with $k=\infty$. There is a twelve-element finite group of Möbius transformations such that two curves in Hesse normal form, with coefficients $k$ and $k'$, are projectively equivalent if and only if some element of this group maps $k$ to $k'$. This same group can be used to provide a product formula mapping any coefficient $k$ to the corresponding j-invariant.

It follows from the symmetries of the Hesse normal form that every non-singular complex projective curve has a group of at least 18 projective automorphisms (projective transformations that leave the curve unchanged), and that every non-singular real projective curve has a group of at least 6 projective automorphisms.

== Associated with triangles ==
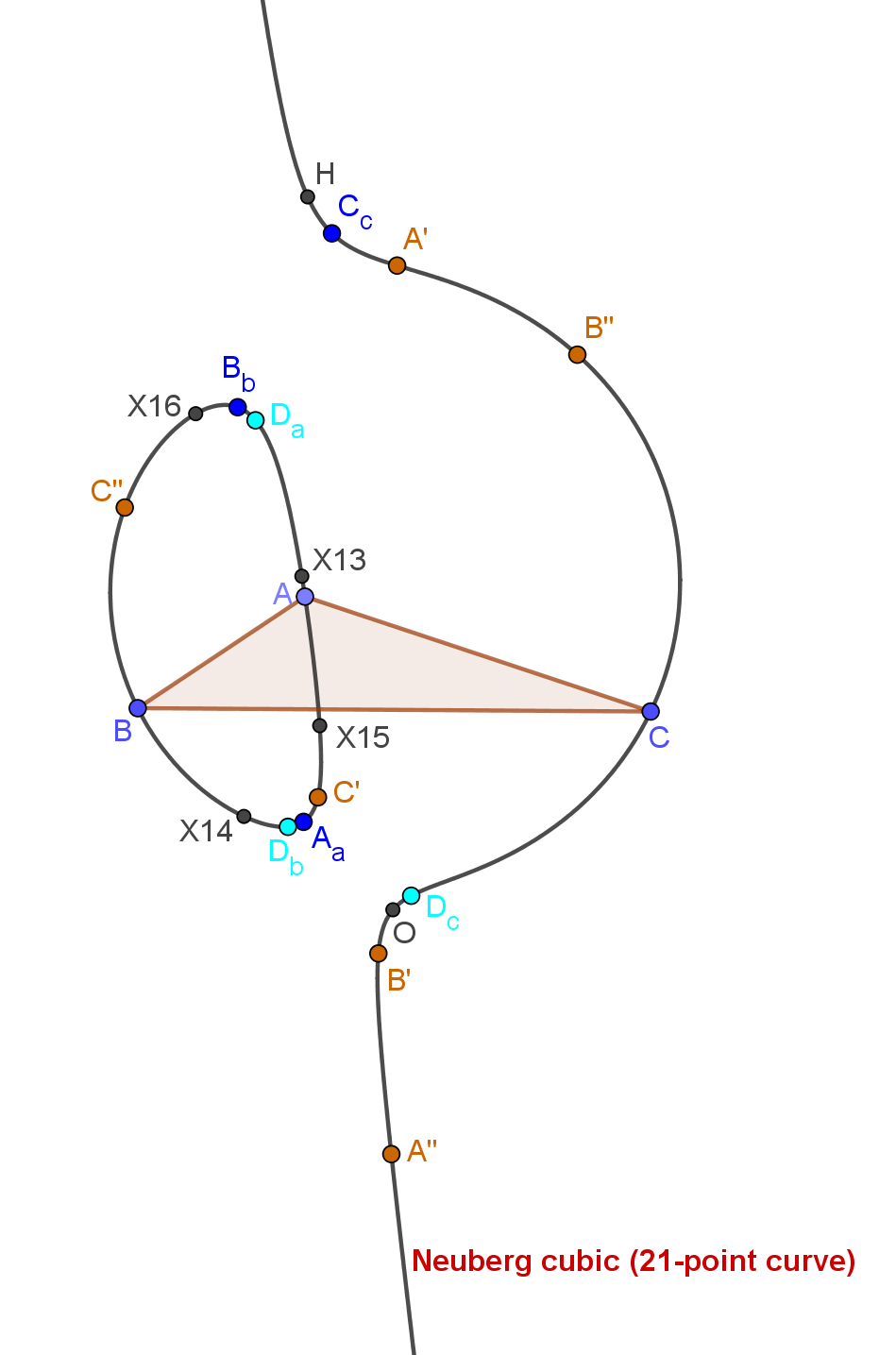
The Neuberg cubic passing through 21 special points of a triangle

Relative to a given triangle, many named cubics pass through the vertices of the triangle and its triangle centers. These include the curves listed below using barycentric coordinates. In this coordinate system, each of the three coordinates $x$, $y$, and $z$ gives the signed distance from the line through one side of the triangle, normalized so that the vertices of the triangle have coordinates (0,0,1), (0,1,0), and (1,0,0). The examples below simplify the equations for each cubic using the cyclic sum notation
$$\begin{align}\sum_{\text{cyclic}}& f(x,y,z,a,b,c) =\\
&f(a,b,c,x,y,z) + f(b,c,a,y,z,x) + f(c,a,b,z,x,y).\\
\end{align}$$

Notable triangle cubics include the following.

- The Neuberg cubic has the equation
  $$\sum_{\text{cyclic}} [a^2(b^2+c^2)- (b^2-c^2)^2 -2a^4]x(c^2y^2 - b^2z^2)=0.$$
- The Thomson cubic has the equation
  $$\sum_{\text{cyclic}} x(c^2y^2 - b^2z^2)=0.$$
- The McCay cubic has the equation
  $$\sum_{\text{cyclic}} a^2(b^2+c^2-a^2)x(c^2y^2 - b^2z^2)=0.$$
