= Catalogue of Triangle Cubics =

Online mathematics resource for cubic plane curves

The Catalogue of Triangle Cubics is an online resource containing detailed information about more than 1200 cubic curves in the plane of a reference triangle. The resource is maintained by Bernard Gibert. Each cubic in the resource is assigned a unique identification number of the form "Knnn" where "nnn" denotes three digits. The identification number of the first entry in the catalogue is "K001" which is the Neuberg cubic of the reference triangle ABC. The catalogue provides, among other things, the following information about each of the cubics listed:

- Barycentric equation of the curve
- A list of triangle centers which lie on the curve
- Special points on the curve which are not triangle centers
- Geometric properties of the curve
- Locus properties of the curve
- Other special properties of the curve
- Other curves related to the cubic curve
- Plenty of neat and tidy figures illustrating the various properties
- References to literature on the curve

The equations of some of the cubics listed in the Catalogue are so incredibly complicated that the maintainer of the website has refrained from putting up the equation in the webpage of the cubic; instead, a link to a file giving the equation in an unformatted text form is provided. For example, the equation of the cubic K1200 is given as a text file.

== Coordinates ==
Suppose that △ABC is a triangle with sidelengths $a = |BC|,$ $b = |CA|,$ $c = |AB|.$ Relative to △ABC, many named cubics pass through well-known points. Examples shown below use two kinds of homogeneous coordinates: trilinear and barycentric.

To convert from trilinear to barycentric in a cubic equation, substitute as follows:

$$x \to bcx, \quad y \to cay, \quad z \to abz;$$

to convert from barycentric to trilinear, use

$$x \to ax, \quad y \to by, \quad z \to cz.$$

Many equations for cubics have the form

$$f(a,b,c,x,y,z) + f(b,c,a,y,z,x) + f(c,a,b,z,x,y) = 0.$$

In the examples below, such equations are written more succinctly in "cyclic sum notation", like this:

$$\sum_{\text{cyclic}} f(x,y,z,a,b,c) = 0$$.

The cubics listed below can be defined in terms of the isogonal conjugate, denoted by X*, of a point X not on a sideline of △ABC. A construction of X* follows. Let L_{A} be the reflection of line XA about the internal angle bisector of angle A, and define L_{B} and L_{C} analogously. Then the three reflected lines concur in X*. In trilinear coordinates, if $X = x:y:z,$ then $X^* = \tfrac{1}{x}:\tfrac{1}{y}:\tfrac{1}{z}.$

== First few triangle cubics in the catalogue ==
The following are the first ten cubics given in the Catalogue.

Identification number	Name(s)	Equation in barycentric coordinates
K001	Neuberg cubic, 21-point cubic, 37-point cubic	$\sum_{\text{cyclic}} [a^2(b^2+c^2)- (b^2-c^2)^2 -2a^4]x(c^2y^2 - b^2z^2)=0$
K002	Thomson cubic, 17-point cubic	$\sum_{\text{cyclic}} x(c^2y^2 - b^2z^2)=0$
K003	McCay cubic, Griffiths cubic	$\sum_{\text{cyclic}} a^2(b^2+c^2-a^2)x(c^2y^2 - b^2z^2)=0$
K004	Darboux cubic	$\sum_{\text{cyclic}} [2a^2(b^2+c^2)- (b^2-c^2)^2 -3a^4]x(c^2y^2 - b^2z^2)=0$
K005	Napoleon cubic, Feuerbach cubic	$\sum_{\text{cyclic}} [a^2(b^2+c^2)- (b^2-c^2)^2]x(c^2y^2 - b^2z^2)=0$
K006	Orthocubic	$\sum_{\text{cyclic}} (c^2+a^2-b^2)(a^2+b^2-c^2)x(c^2y^2 - b^2z^2)=0$
K007	Lucas cubic	$\sum_{\text{cyclic}} (b^2+c^2-a^2)x(y^2-z^2)=0$
K008	Droussent cubic	$\sum_{\text{cyclic}} (b^4+c^4-a^4-b^2c^2)x(y^2-z^2)=0$
K009	Lemoine cubic	$$\begin{align}&2(a^2-b^2)(b^2-c^2)(c^2-a^2)xyz\\&\sum_{\text{cyclic}}a^4(b^2+c^2-a^2)yz(y-z)=0\end{align}$$
K010	Simson cubic	$\sum_{\text{cyclic}} a^2\frac{y+z}{y-z}=0$

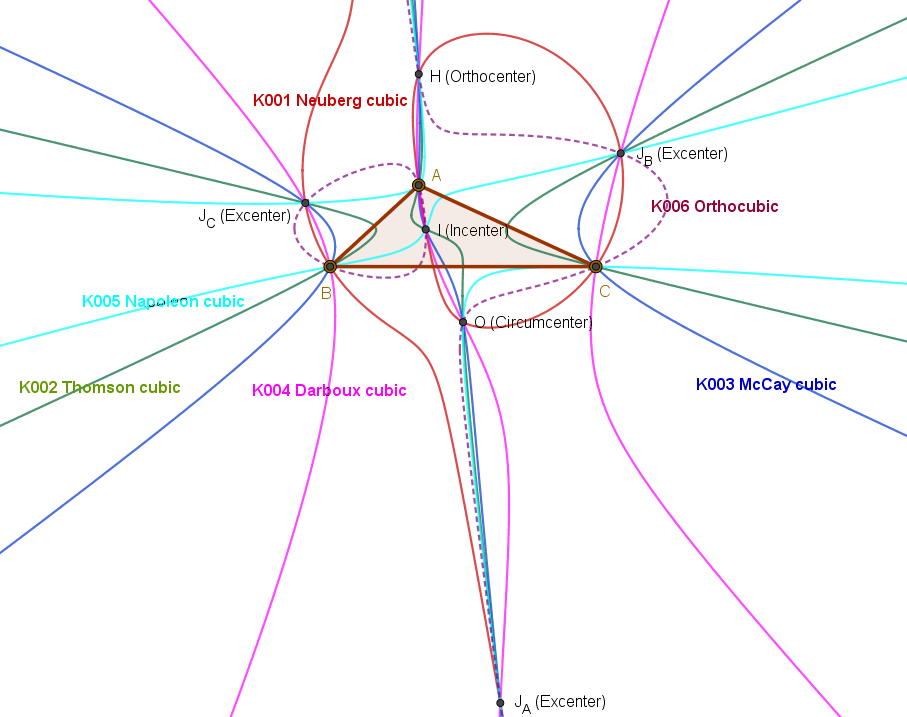
First six cubics in the Catalogue of Triangle Cubics

== Individual curves ==
=== Neuberg cubic ===
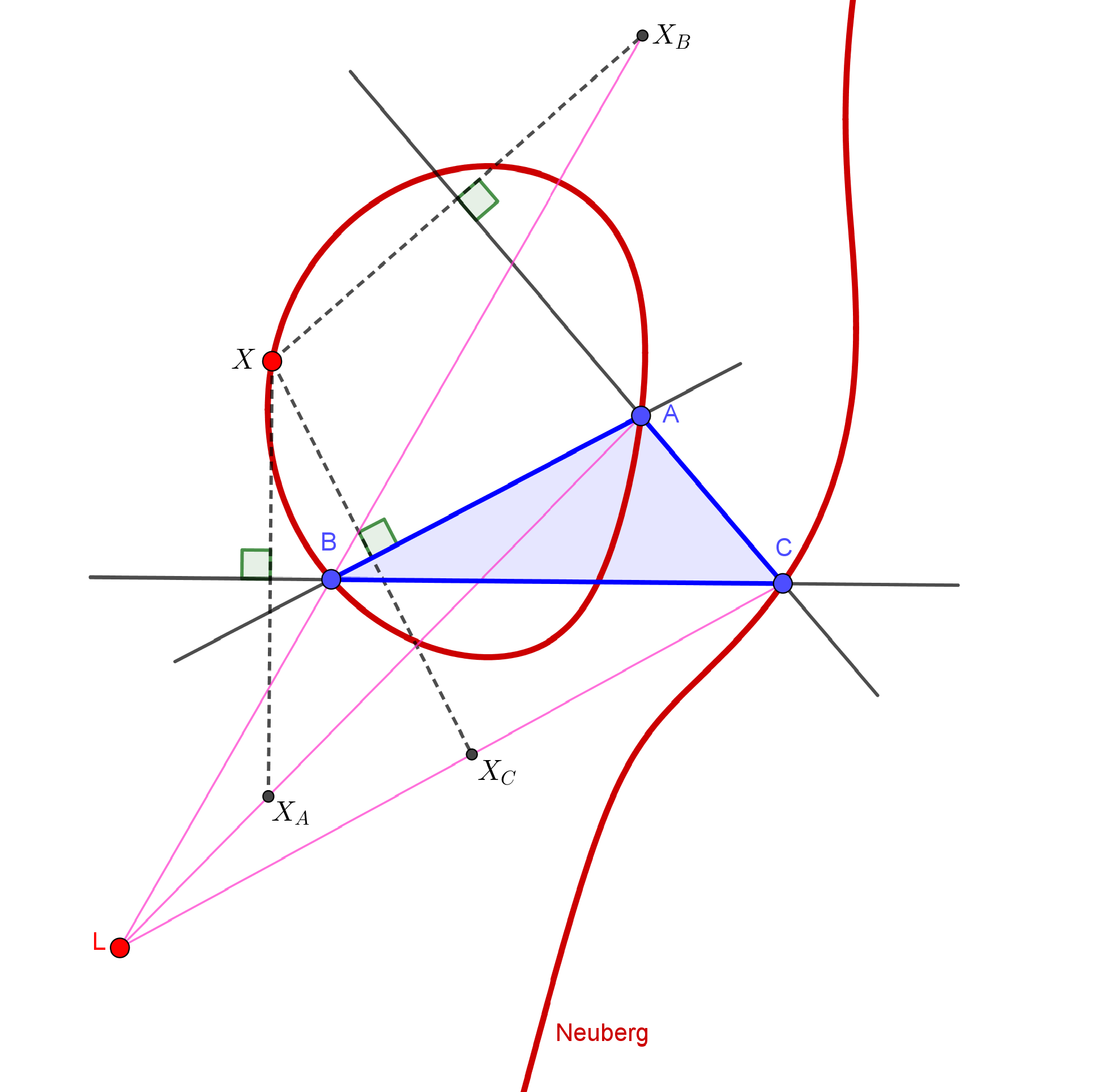
Neuberg cubic of triangle △ABC: The locus of X such that, if X_{A}, X_{B}, X_{C} are the reflections of X in the sidelines BC, CA, AB, then the lines AX_{A}, BX_{B}, CX_{C} are concurrent.

Trilinear equation: $\sum_{\text{cyclic}} (\cos{A} - 2\cos{B}\cos{C})x(y^2-z^2)= 0$

Barycentric equation: $\sum_{\text{cyclic}} (a^2(b^2 + c^2) + (b^2 - c^2)^2 - 2a^4)x(c^2y^2-b^2z^2) = 0$

The Neuberg cubic (named after Joseph Jean Baptiste Neuberg) is the locus of a point X such that X* is on the line EX, where E is the Euler infinity point (X(30) in the Encyclopedia of Triangle Centers). Also, this cubic is the locus of X such that the triangle △X_{A}X_{B}X_{C} is perspective to △ABC, where △X_{A}X_{B}X_{C} is the reflection of X in the lines BC, CA, AB, respectively

The Neuberg cubic passes through the following points: incenter, circumcenter, orthocenter, both Fermat points, both isodynamic points, the Euler infinity point, other triangle centers, the excenters, the reflections of A, B, C in the sidelines of △ABC, and the vertices of the six equilateral triangles erected on the sides of △ABC.

For a graphical representation and extensive list of properties of the Neuberg cubic, see K001 at Berhard Gibert's Cubics in the Triangle Plane.

=== Thomson cubic ===
Example of Thomson cubic (black curve). X is on the cubic, such that the isogonal conjugate of X (X′) is on the line X(2) – X.

Trilinear equation: $\sum_{\text{cyclic}} bcx(y^2-z^2)= 0$

Barycentric equation: $\sum_{\text{cyclic}} x(c^2y^2-b^2z^2)= 0$

The Thomson cubic is the locus of a point X such that X* is on the line GX, where G is the centroid.

The Thomson cubic passes through the following points: incenter, centroid, circumcenter, orthocenter, symmedian point, other triangle centers, the vertices A, B, C, the excenters, the midpoints of sides BC, CA, AB, and the midpoints of the altitudes of △ABC. For each point P on the cubic but not on a sideline of △ABC, the isogonal conjugate of P is also on the cubic.

For graphs and properties, see K002 at Cubics in the Triangle Plane.

=== Darboux cubic ===
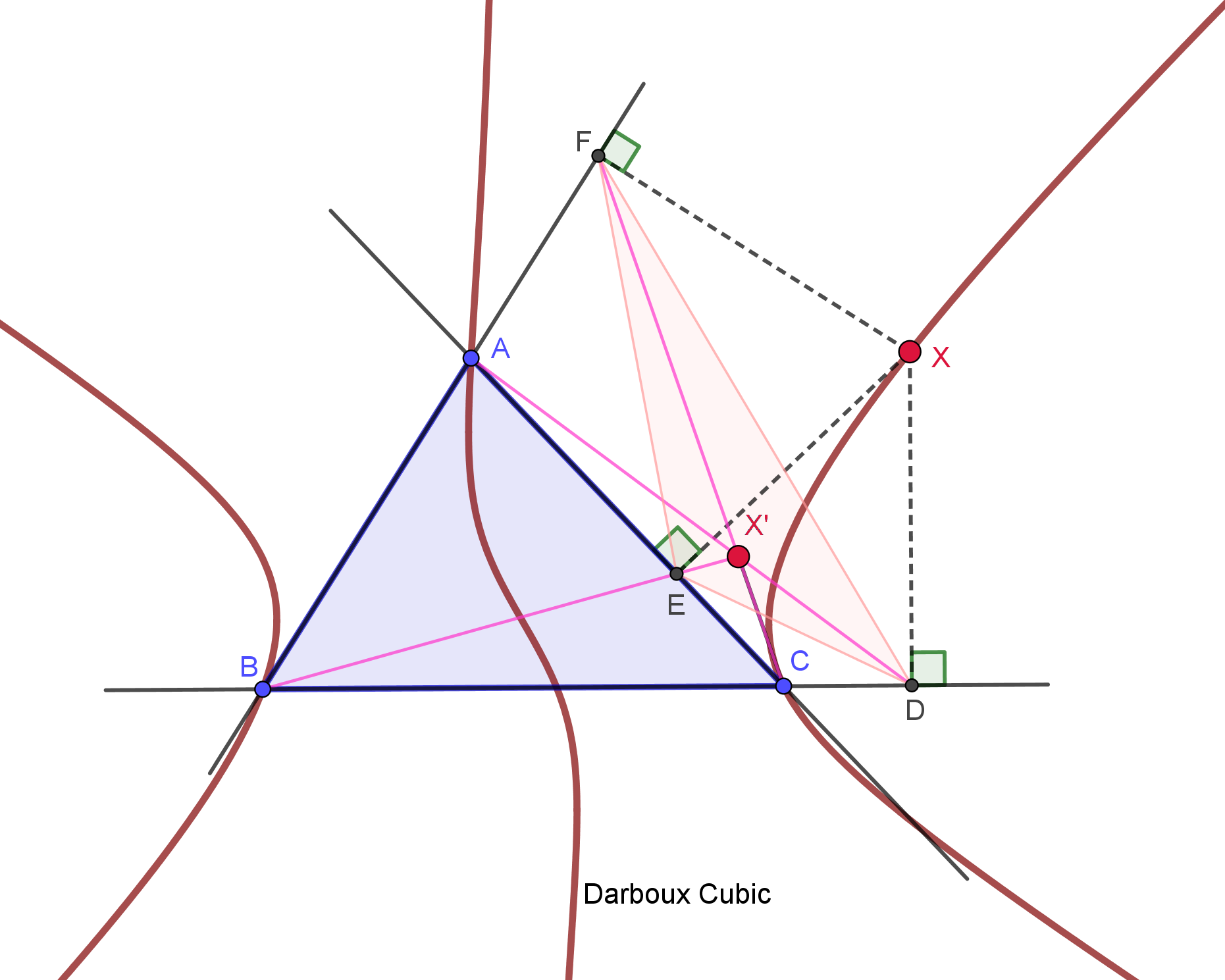
Darboux cubic of triangle △ABC: The locus of X such that if D, E, F are the feet of perpendiculars from X to the sidelines BC, CA, AB then the lines AD, BE, CF are concurrent.

Trilinear equation:$\sum_{\text{cyclic}} (\cos{A} - \cos{B}\cos{C})x(y^2-z^2)= 0$

Barycentric equation: $\sum_{\text{cyclic}} (2a^2(b^2 + c^2) + (b^2 - c^2)^2 - 3a^4)x(c^2y^2-b^2z^2) = 0$

The Darboux cubic is the locus of a point X such that X* is on the line LX, where L is the de Longchamps point. Also, this cubic is the locus of X such that the pedal triangle of X is the cevian triangle of some point (which lies on the Lucas cubic). Also, this cubic is the locus of a point X such that the pedal triangle of X and the anticevian triangle of X are perspective; the perspector lies on the Thomson cubic.

The Darboux cubic passes through the incenter, circumcenter, orthocenter, de Longchamps point, other triangle centers, the vertices A, B, C, the excenters, and the antipodes of A, B, C on the circumcircle. For each point P on the cubic but not on a sideline of △ABC, the isogonal conjugate of P is also on the cubic.

For graphics and properties, see K004 at Cubics in the Triangle Plane.

=== Napoleon–Feuerbach cubic ===
Trilinear equation: $\sum_{\text{cyclic}} \cos(B-C)x(y^2-z^2)= 0$

Barycentric equation: $\sum_{\text{cyclic}} (a^2(b^2 + c^2) + (b^2 - c^2)^2)x(c^2y^2-b^2z^2) = 0$

The Napoleon–Feuerbach cubic is the locus of a point X* is on the line NX, where N is the nine-point center, (N = X(5) in the Encyclopedia of Triangle Centers).

The Napoleon–Feuerbach cubic passes through the incenter, circumcenter, orthocenter, 1st and 2nd Napoleon points, other triangle centers, the vertices A, B, C, the excenters, the projections of the centroid on the altitudes, and the centers of the 6 equilateral triangles erected on the sides of △ABC.

For a graphics and properties, see K005 at Cubics in the Triangle Plane.

=== Lucas cubic ===
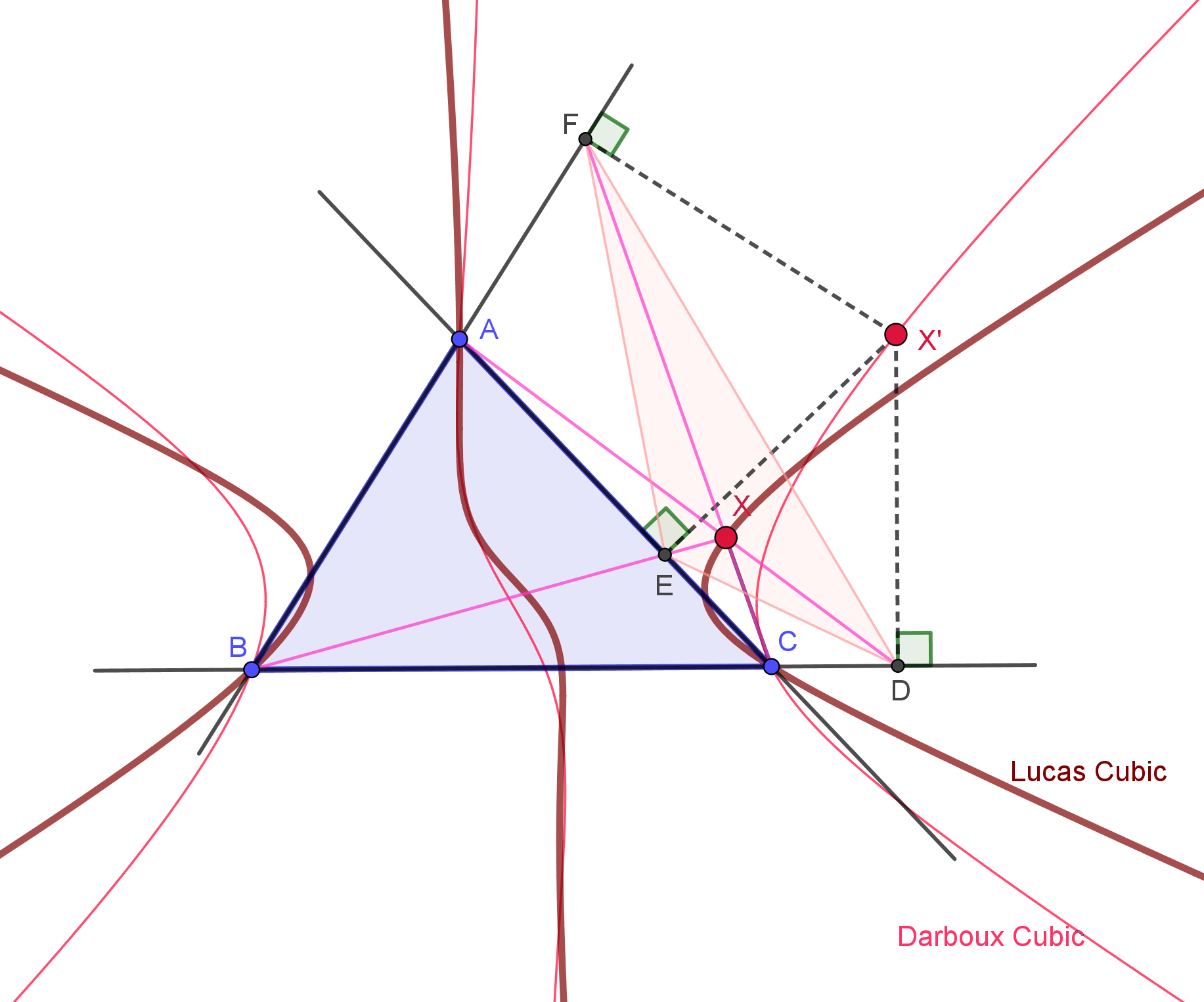
Lucas Cubic of triangle △ABC: The locus of a point X such that the cevian triangle of X is the pedal triangle of some point X'; the point X' lies on the Darboux cubic.

Trilinear equation: $\sum_{\text{cyclic}} \cos(A)x(b^2y^2- c^2z^2)= 0$

Barycentric equation: $\sum_{\text{cyclic}} (b^2+c^2-a^2)x(y^2-z^2)= 0$

The Lucas cubic is the locus of a point X such that the cevian triangle of X is the pedal triangle of some point; the point lies on the Darboux cubic.

The Lucas cubic passes through the centroid, orthocenter, Gergonne point, Nagel point, de Longchamps point, other triangle centers, the vertices of the anticomplementary triangle, and the foci of the Steiner circumellipse.

For graphics and properties, see K007 at Cubics in the Triangle Plane.

=== 1st Brocard cubic ===
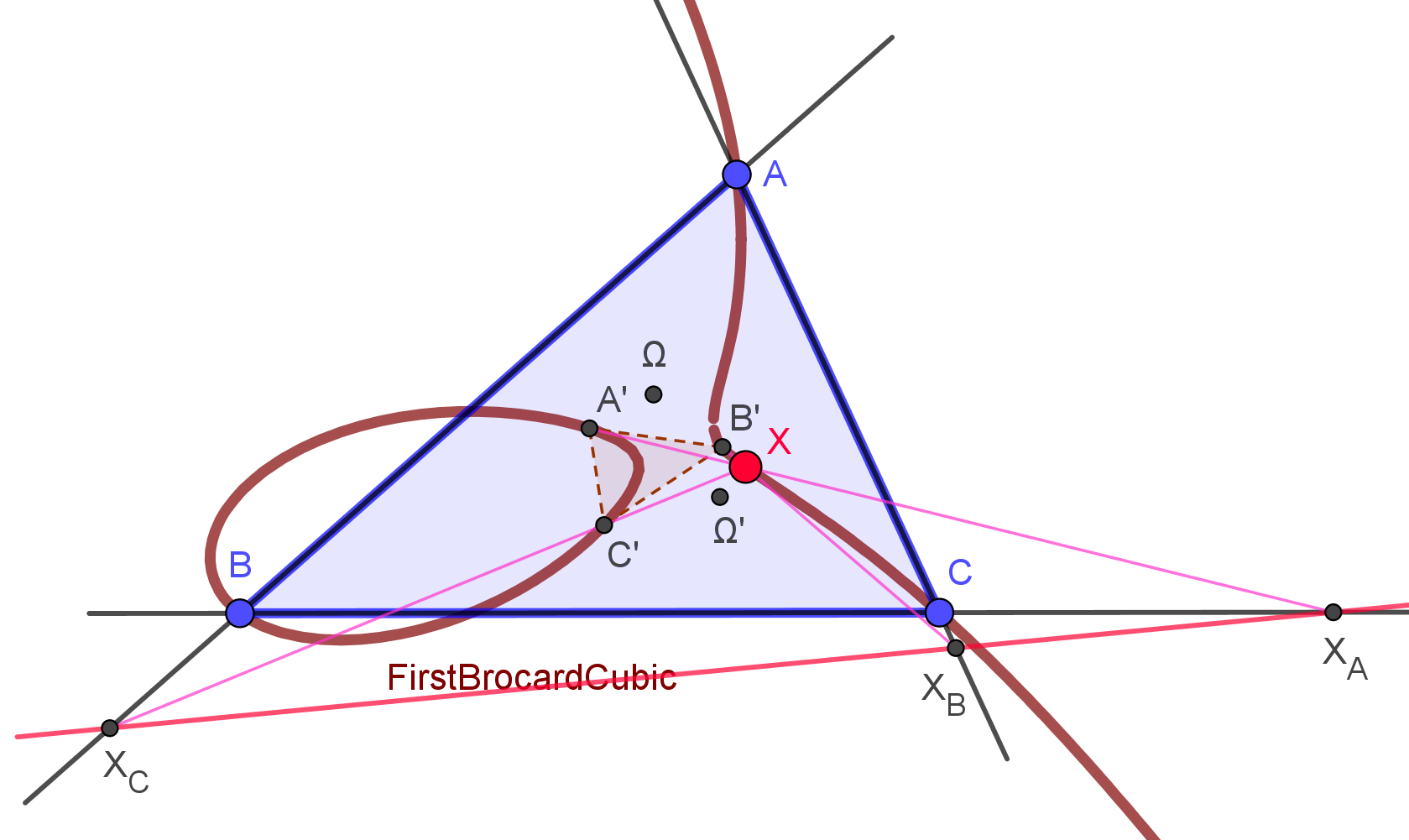
First Brocard Cubic: It is the locus of X such the intersections of XA', XB', XC' with the sidelines BC, CA, CB, where △A'B'C' is the first Brocard triangle of triangle △ABC, are collinear. In the figure Ω and Ω′ are the first and second Brocard points.

Trilinear equation:$\sum_{\text{cyclic}} bc(a^4-b^2c^2)x(y^2+z^2)= 0$

Barycentric equation: $\sum_{\text{cyclic}} (a^4-b^2c^2)x(c^2y^2+b^2z^2)= 0$

Let △A'B'C' be the 1st Brocard triangle. For arbitrary point X, let X_{A}, X_{B}, X_{C} be the intersections of the lines XA′, XB′, XC′ with the sidelines BC, CA, AB, respectively. The 1st Brocard cubic is the locus of X for which the points X_{A}, X_{B}, X_{C} are collinear.

The 1st Brocard cubic passes through the centroid, symmedian point, Steiner point, other triangle centers, and the vertices of the 1st and 3rd Brocard triangles.

For graphics and properties, see K017 at Cubics in the Triangle Plane.

=== 2nd Brocard cubic ===
Trilinear equation: $\sum_{\text{cyclic}} bc(b^2-c^2)x(y^2+z^2)= 0$

Barycentric equation: $\sum_{\text{cyclic}} (b^2-c^2)x(c^2y^2+b^2z^2)= 0$

The 2nd Brocard cubic is the locus of a point X for which the pole of the line XX* in the circumconic through X and X* lies on the line of the circumcenter and the symmedian point (i.e., the Brocard axis). The cubic passes through the centroid, symmedian point, both Fermat points, both isodynamic points, the Parry point, other triangle centers, and the vertices of the 2nd and 4th Brocard triangles.

For a graphics and properties, see K018 at Cubics in the Triangle Plane.

=== 1st equal areas cubic ===
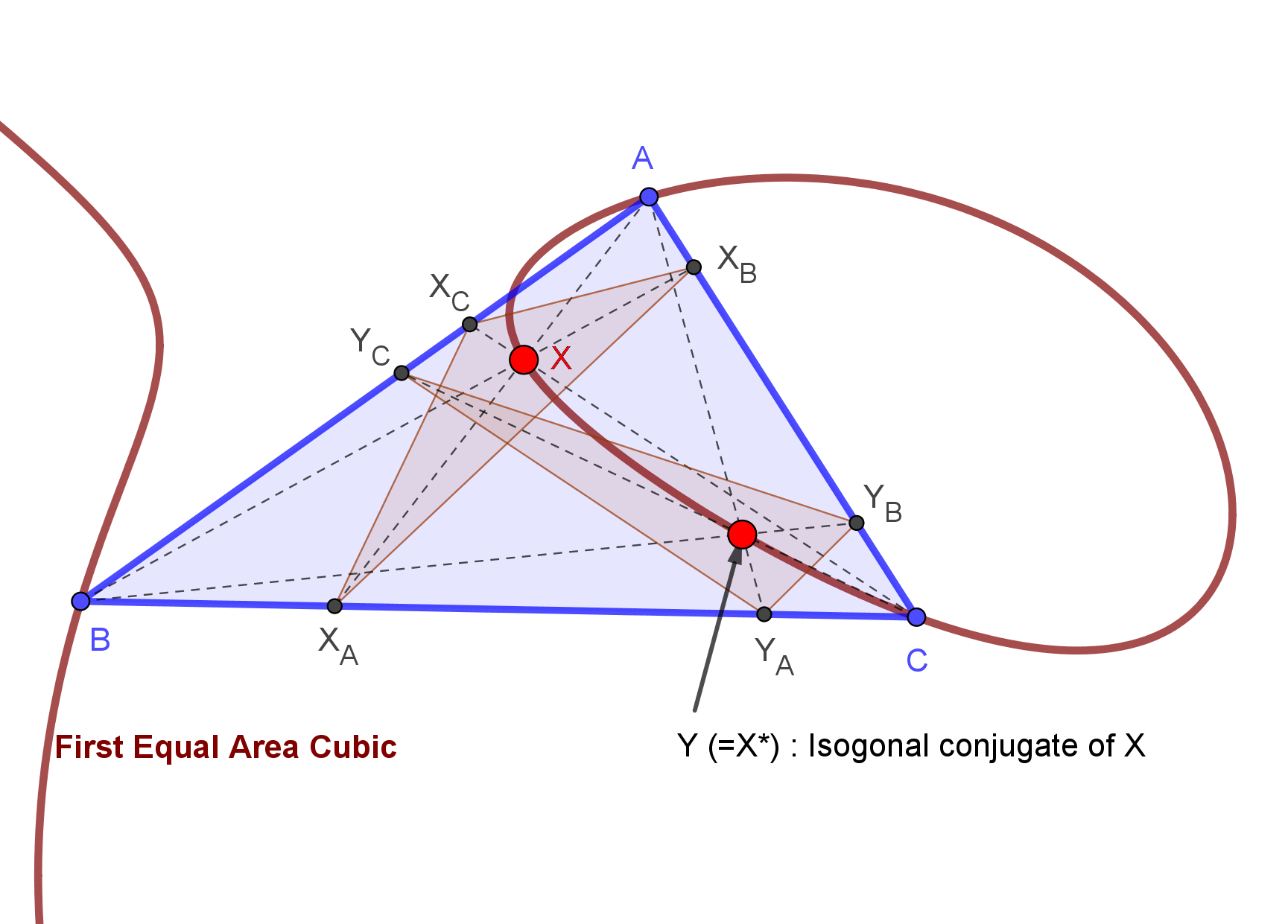
First equal area cubic of triangle △ABC: The locus of a point X such that area of the cevian triangle of X equals the area of the cevian triangle of X*.

Trilinear equation: $\sum_{\text{cyclic}} a(b^2-c^2)x(y^2-z^2)= 0$

Barycentric equation: $\sum_{\text{cyclic}} a^2(b^2-c^2)x(c^2y^2-b^2z^2)= 0$

The 1st equal areas cubic is the locus of a point X such that area of the cevian triangle of X equals the area of the cevian triangle of X*. Also, this cubic is the locus of X for which X* is on the line S*X, where S is the Steiner point. (S = X(99) in the Encyclopedia of Triangle Centers).

The 1st equal areas cubic passes through the incenter, Steiner point, other triangle centers, the 1st and 2nd Brocard points, and the excenters.

For a graphics and properties, see K021 at Cubics in the Triangle Plane.

=== 2nd equal areas cubic ===
Trilinear equation: $(bz+cx)(cx+ay)(ay+bz) = (bx+cy)(cy +az)(az+bx)$

Barycentric equation:$\sum_{\text{cyclic}} a(a^2-bc)x(c^3y^2 - b^3z^2) = 0$

For any point $X = x:y:z$ (trilinears), let $X_Y = y:z:x$ and $X_Z = z:x:y.$ The 2nd equal areas cubic is the locus of X such that the area of the cevian triangle of X_{Y} equals the area of the cevian triangle of X_{Z}.

The 2nd equal areas cubic passes through the incenter, centroid, symmedian point, and points in Encyclopedia of Triangle Centers indexed as X(31), X(105), X(238), X(292), X(365), X(672), X(1453), X(1931), X(2053), and others.

For a graphics and properties, see K155 at Cubics in the Triangle Plane.

== GeoGebra tool to draw triangle cubics ==
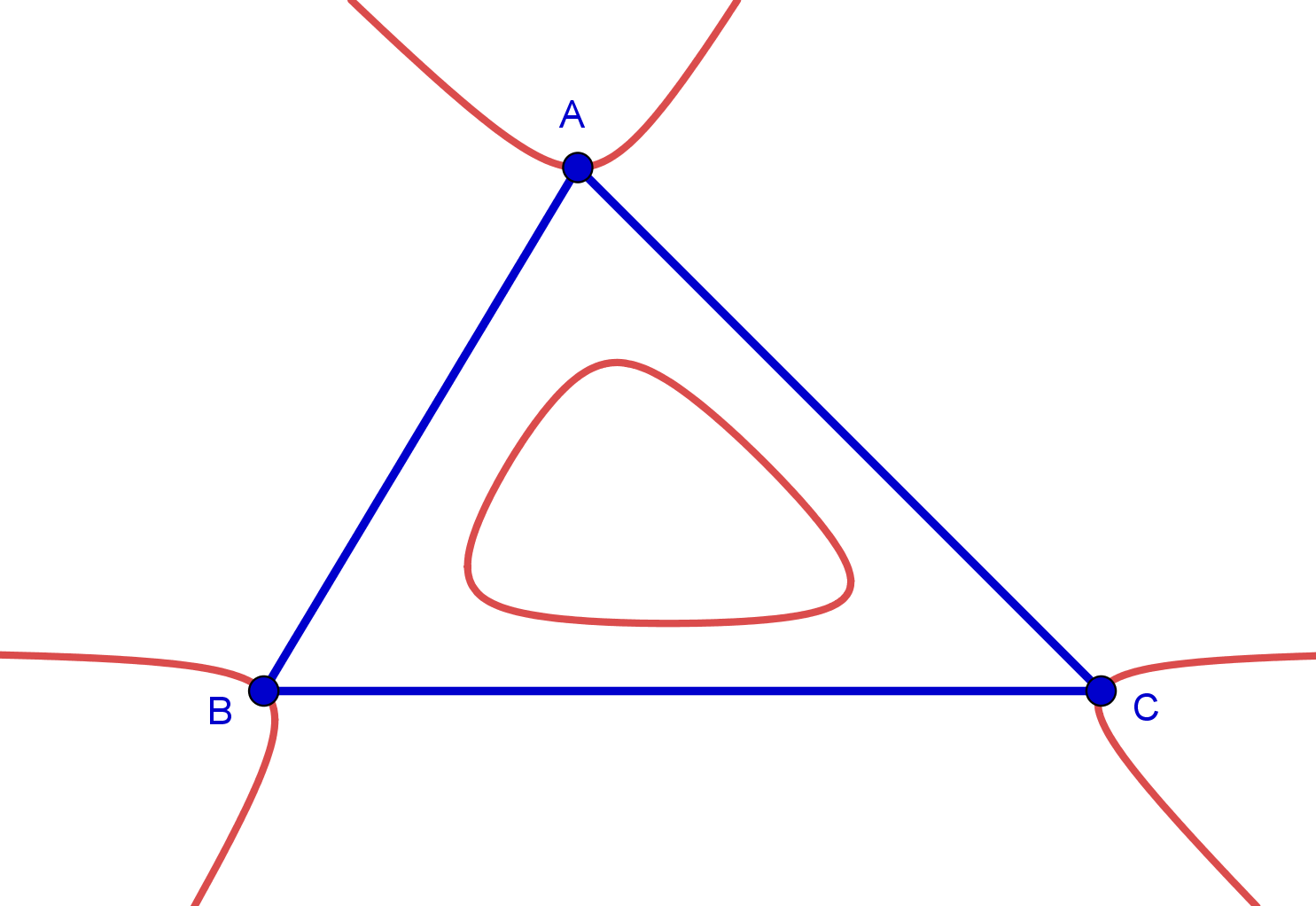
Tucker cubic (cubic K011 in the Catalogue) of triangle ABC drawn using the GeoGebra command Cubic(A,B,C,11).

GeoGebra, the software package for interactive geometry, algebra, statistics and calculus application has a built-in tool for drawing the cubics listed in the Catalogue. The command

- Cubic( <Point>, <Point>, <Point>, n)

prints the n-th cubic in the Catalogue for the triangle whose vertices are the three points listed. For example, to print the Thomson cubic of the triangle whose vertices are A, B, C the following command may be issued:

- Cubic(A, B, C, 2)

== See also ==
- Modern triangle geometry
