= Plücker formula =

In mathematics, a Plücker formula, named after Julius Plücker, is one of a family of formulae, of a type first developed by Plücker in the 1830s, that relate certain numeric invariants of algebraic curves to corresponding invariants of their dual curves. The invariant called the genus, common to both the curve and its dual, is connected to the other invariants by similar formulae. These formulae, and the fact that each of the invariants must be a positive integer, place quite strict limitations on their possible values.

== Plücker invariants and basic equations ==
A curve in this context is defined by a non-degenerate algebraic equation in the complex projective plane. Lines in this plane correspond to points in the dual projective plane and the lines tangent to a given algebraic curve C correspond to points in an algebraic curve C^{*} called the dual curve. In the correspondence between the projective plane and its dual, points on C correspond to lines tangent C^{*}, so the dual of C^{*} can be identified with C.

The first two invariants covered by the Plücker formulas are the degree d of the curve C and the degree d^{*}, classically called the class of C. Geometrically, d is the number of times a given line intersects C with multiplicities properly counted. (This includes complex points and points at infinity since the curves are taken to be subsets of the complex projective plane.) Similarly, d^{*} is the number of tangents to C that are lines through a given point on the plane; so for example a conic section has degree and class both 2. If C has no singularities, the first Plücker equation states that

$$d^* = d(d-1)\,$$

but this must be corrected for singular curves.

Of the double points of C, let δ be the number that are ordinary, i.e. that have distinct tangents (these are also called nodes) or are isolated points, and let κ be the number that are cusps, i.e. having a single tangent (spinodes). If C has higher order singularities then these are counted as multiple double points according to an analysis of the nature of the singularity. For example an ordinary triple point is counted as 3 double points. Again, complex points and points at infinity are included in these counts. The corrected form is of the first Plücker equation is

$$d^* = d(d-1)-2\delta-3\kappa.\,$$

Similarly, let δ^{*} be the number of ordinary double points, and κ^{*} the number of cusps of C^{*}. Then the second Plücker equation states

$$\kappa^* = 3d(d-2)-6\delta-8\kappa.\,$$

The geometric interpretation of an ordinary double point of C^{*} is a line that is tangent to the curve at two points (double tangent) and the geometric interpretation of a cusp of C^{*} is a point of inflection (stationary tangent).

Consider for instance, the case of a smooth cubic:

$$d=3,\ \delta=\kappa=0$$

The above formula shows that it has

$$\kappa^* = 9\,$$

inflections. If the cubic degenerates and gets a double point, then 6 points converge to the singular point and only 3 inflection remain along the singular curve. If the cubic degenerates and gets a cusp then only one inflection remains.

Note that the first two Plücker equations have dual versions:

$$d = d^*(d^*-1)-2\delta^*-3\kappa^*,\,$$
$$\kappa = 3d^*(d^*-2)-6\delta^*-8\kappa^*.\,$$

The four equations given so far are, in fact, dependent, so any three may be used to derive the remaining one. From them, given any three of the six invariants, d, d^{*}, δ, δ^{*}, κ, κ^{*}, the remaining three can be computed.

Finally, the genus of C, classically known as the deficiency of C, can be defined as

$$g={1\over 2}(d-1)(d-2)-\delta-\kappa.$$

This is equal to the dual quantity

$$g={1\over 2}(d^*-1)(d^*-2)-\delta^*-\kappa^*$$

and is a positive integer.

Altogether there are four independent equations in 7 unknowns, and with them any three of these invariants can be used to compute the remaining four.

== Non-singular curves ==
An important special case is when the curve C is non-singular, or equivalently δ and κ are 0, so the remaining invariants can be computed in terms of d only. In this case the results are:

$$d^* = d(d-1)\,$$
$$\delta^*={1\over 2}d(d-2)(d-3)(d+3)$$
$$\kappa^* = 3d(d-2)\,$$
$$g={1\over 2}(d-1)(d-2).$$

So, for example, a non-singular quartic plane curve is of genus 3 and has 28 bitangents and 24 points of inflection.

== Curve types ==
Curves are classified into types according to their Plücker invariants. The Plücker equations together with the restriction that the Plücker invariants must all be natural numbers greatly limits the number of possible types for curves of a given degree. Curves which are projectively equivalent have the same type, though curves of the same type are not, in general, projectively equivalent. Curves of degree 2, conic sections, have a single type given by d=d^{*}=2, δ=δ^{*}=κ=κ^{*}=g=0.

For curves of degree 3 there are three possible types, given by:

Type	d	d^{*}	δ	δ^{*}	κ	κ^{*}	g
(i)	3	6	0	0	0	9	1
(ii)	3	4	1	0	0	3	0
(iii)	3	3	0	0	1	1	0

Curves of types (ii) and (iii) are the rational cubics and are call nodal and cuspidal respectively. Curves of type (i) are the nonsingular cubics (elliptic curves).

For curves of degree 4 there are 10 possible types, given by:

Type	d	d^{*}	δ	δ^{*}	κ	κ^{*}	g
(i)	4	12	0	28	0	24	3
(ii)	4	10	1	16	0	18	2
(iii)	4	9	0	10	1	16	2
(iv)	4	8	2	8	0	12	1
(v)	4	7	1	4	1	10	1
(vi)	4	6	0	1	2	8	1
(vii)	4	6	3	4	0	6	0
(viii)	4	5	2	2	1	4	0
(ix)	4	4	1	1	2	2	0
(x)	4	3	0	1	3	0	0
