= Polar curve =

The elliptic curve E : 4Y^{2}Z = X^{3} − XZ^{2} in blue, and its polar curve (E) : 4Y^{2} = 2.7X^{2} − 2XZ − 0.9Z^{2} for the point Q = (0.9, 0) in red. The black lines show the tangents to E at the intersection points of E and its first polar with respect to Q meeting at Q.

In algebraic geometry, the first polar, or simply polar of an algebraic plane curve C of degree n with respect to a point Q is an algebraic curve of degree n−1 which contains every point of C whose tangent line passes through Q. It is used to investigate the relationship between the curve and its dual, for example in the derivation of the Plücker formulas.

== Definition ==
Let C be defined in homogeneous coordinates by f(x, y, z) = 0 where f is a homogeneous polynomial of degree n, and let the homogeneous coordinates of Q be (a, b, c). Define the operator

$$\Delta_Q = a{\partial\over\partial x}+b{\partial\over\partial y}+c{\partial\over\partial z}.$$

Then Δ_{Q}f is a homogeneous polynomial of degree n−1 and Δ_{Q}f(x, y, z) = 0 defines a curve of degree n−1 called the first polar of C with respect of Q.

If P=(p, q, r) is a non-singular point on the curve C then the equation of the tangent at P is

$$x{\partial f\over\partial x}(p, q, r)+y{\partial f\over\partial y}(p, q, r)+z{\partial f\over\partial z}(p, q, r)=0.$$

In particular, P is on the intersection of C and its first polar with respect to Q if and only if Q is on the tangent to C at P. For a double point of C, the partial derivatives of f are all 0 so the first polar contains these points as well.

== Class of a curve ==
The class of C may be defined as the number of tangents that may be drawn to C from a point not on C (counting multiplicities and including imaginary tangents). Each of these tangents touches C at one of the points of intersection of C and the first polar, and by Bézout's theorem there are at most n(n−1) of these. This puts an upper bound of n(n−1) on the class of a curve of degree n. The class may be computed exactly by counting the number and type of singular points on C (see Plücker formula).

== Higher polars ==
The p-th polar of a C for a natural number p is defined as Δ_{Q}^{p}f(x, y, z) = 0. This is a curve of degree n−p. When p is n−1 the p-th polar is a line called the polar line of C with respect to Q. Similarly, when p is n−2 the curve is called the polar conic of C.

Using Taylor series in several variables and exploiting homogeneity, f(λa+μp, λb+μq, λc+μr) can be expanded in two ways as

$$\mu^nf(p, q, r) + \lambda\mu^{n-1}\Delta_Q f(p, q, r) + \frac{1}{2}\lambda^2\mu^{n-2}\Delta_Q^2 f(p, q, r)+\dots$$

and

$$\lambda^nf(a, b, c) + \mu\lambda^{n-1}\Delta_P f(a, b, c) + \frac{1}{2}\mu^2\lambda^{n-2}\Delta_P^2 f(a, b, c)+\dots .$$

Comparing coefficients of λ^{p}μ^{n−p} shows that

$$\frac{1}{p!}\Delta_Q^p f(p, q, r)=\frac{1}{(n-p)!}\Delta_P^{n-p} f(a, b, c).$$

In particular, the p-th polar of C with respect to Q is the locus of points P so that the (n−p)-th polar of C with respect to P passes through Q.

== Poles ==
If the polar line of C with respect to a point Q is a line L, then Q is said to be a pole of L. A given line has (n−1)^{2} poles (counting multiplicities etc.) where n is the degree of C. To see this, pick two points P and Q on L. The locus of points whose polar lines pass through P is the first polar of P and this is a curve of degree n−1. Similarly, the locus of points whose polar lines pass through Q is the first polar of Q and this is also a curve of degree n−1. The polar line of a point is L if and only if it contains both P and Q, so the poles of L are exactly the points of intersection of the two first polars. By Bézout's theorem these curves have (n−1)^{2} points of intersection and these are the poles of L.

== The Hessian ==
For a given point Q=(a, b, c), the polar conic is the locus of points P so that Q is on the second polar of P. In other words, the equation of the polar conic is

$$\Delta_{(x, y, z)}^2 f(a, b, c)=x^2{\partial^2 f\over\partial x^2}(a, b, c)+2xy{\partial^2 f\over\partial x\partial y}(a, b, c)+\dots=0.$$

The conic is degenerate if and only if the determinant of the Hessian of f,

$$H(f) = \begin{bmatrix}
\frac{\partial^2 f}{\partial x^2} & \frac{\partial^2 f}{\partial x\,\partial y} & \frac{\partial^2 f}{\partial x\,\partial z} \\  \\
\frac{\partial^2 f}{\partial y\,\partial x} & \frac{\partial^2 f}{\partial y^2} & \frac{\partial^2 f}{\partial y\,\partial z} \\  \\
\frac{\partial^2 f}{\partial z\,\partial x} & \frac{\partial^2 f}{\partial z\,\partial y} & \frac{\partial^2 f}{\partial z^2}
\end{bmatrix},$$

vanishes. Therefore, the equation |H(f)|=0 defines a curve, the locus of points whose polar conics are degenerate, of degree 3(n−2) called the Hessian curve of C.

== See also ==
- Polar hypersurface
- Pole and polar
