= Ordinary singularity =

In mathematics, an ordinary singularity of an algebraic curve is a singular point of multiplicity r where the r tangents at the point are distinct (Walker 1950, p. 54). In higher dimensions the literature on algebraic geometry contains many inequivalent definitions of ordinary singular points.
