= McCay cubic =

Plane curve unique to a given triangle

In Euclidean geometry, the McCay cubic (also called M'Cay cubic or Griffiths cubic) is a cubic plane curve in the plane of a reference triangle and associated with it. It is the third cubic curve in Bernard Gilbert's Catalogue of Triangle Cubics and it is assigned the identification number K003.

== Definition ==
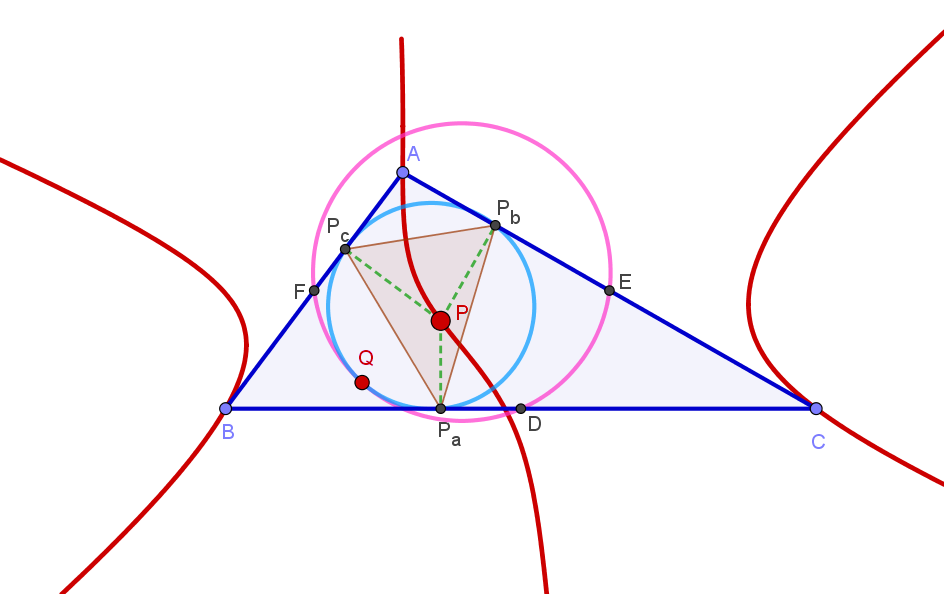
Reference triangle △ABC Nine-point circle of △ABC Pedal triangle of point P Pedal circle (circumcircle of pedal triangle) of P McCay cubic: locus of P such that the pedal circle and nine point circle are tangent

The McCay cubic can be defined by locus properties in several ways. For example, the McCay cubic is the locus of a point P such that the pedal circle of P is tangent to the nine-point circle of the reference triangle △ABC. The McCay cubic can also be defined as the locus of point P such that the circumcevian triangle of P and △ABC are orthologic.

== Equation of the McCay cubic ==
The equation of the McCay cubic in barycentric coordinates $x:y:z$ is

$$\sum_{\text{cyclic}}(a^2(b^2+c^2-a^2)x(c^2y^2-b^2z^2))=0.$$

The equation in trilinear coordinates $\alpha : \beta : \gamma$ is

$$\alpha (\beta^2 - \gamma^2)\cos A + \beta (\gamma^2 - \alpha^2)\cos B + \gamma (\alpha^2 - \beta^2)\cos C = 0$$

== McCay cubic as a stelloid ==
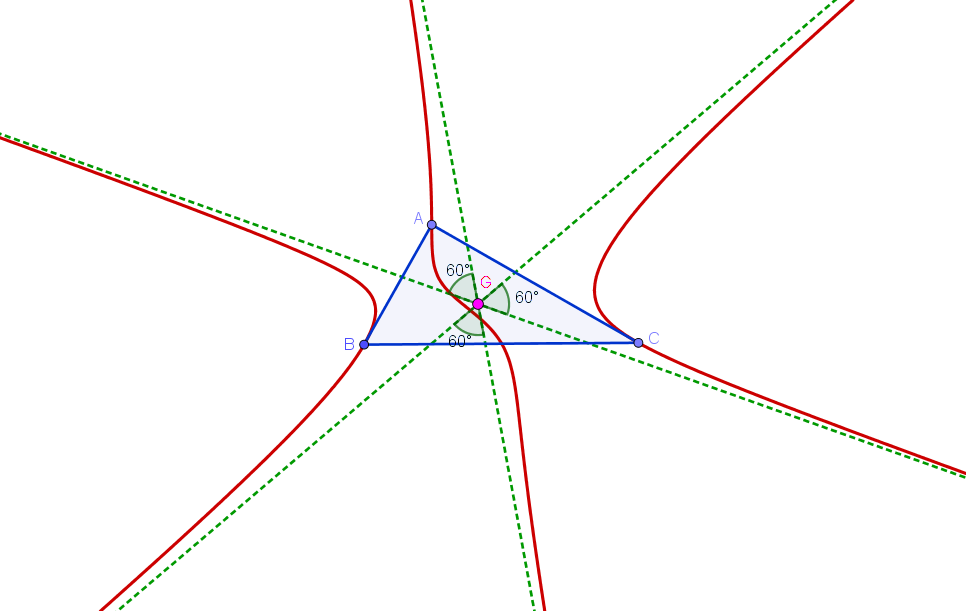
McCay cubic with its three concurring asymptotes

A stelloid is a cubic that has three real concurring asymptotes making 60° angles with one another. McCay cubic is a stelloid in which the three asymptotes concur at the centroid of triangle ABC. A circum-stelloid having the same asymptotic directions as those of McCay cubic and concurring at a certain (finite) is called McCay stelloid. The point where the asymptoptes concur is called the "radial center" of the stelloid. Given a finite point X there is one and only one McCay stelloid with X as the radial center.
