= Tacnode =

Point on a curve at which two or more osculating circles are tangent

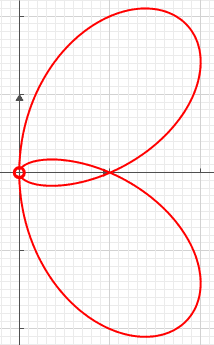
A tacnode at the origin of the curve defined by $(x^2+y^2-3x)^2 - 4x^2(2-x) = 0.$

In classical algebraic geometry, a tacnode (also called a point of osculation or double cusp) is a kind of singular point of a curve. It is defined as a point where two (or more) osculating circles to the curve at that point are tangent. This means that two branches of the curve have ordinary tangency at the double point.

The canonical example is

$$y^2-x^4= 0.$$

A tacnode of an arbitrary curve may then be defined from this example, as a point of self-tangency locally diffeomorphic to the point at the origin of this curve. Another example of a tacnode is given by the links curve shown in the figure, with equation

$$(x^2+y^2-3x)^2 - 4x^2(2-x) = 0.$$

== More general background ==
Consider a smooth real-valued function of two variables, say f (x, y) where x and y are real numbers. So f is a function from the plane to the line. The space of all such smooth functions is acted upon by the group of diffeomorphisms of the plane and the diffeomorphisms of the line, i.e. diffeomorphic changes of coordinate in both the source and the target. This action splits the whole function space up into equivalence classes, i.e. orbits of the group action.

One such family of equivalence classes is denoted by $A_k^\pm,$ where k is a non-negative integer. This notation was introduced by V. I. Arnold. A function f is said to be of type $A_k^\pm$ if it lies in the orbit of $x^2 \pm y^{k+1},$ i.e. there exists a diffeomorphic change of coordinate in source and target which takes f into one of these forms. These simple forms $x^2 \pm y^{k+1}$ are said to give normal forms for the type $A_k^\pm$-singularities.

A curve with equation f = 0 will have a tacnode, say at the origin, if and only if f has a type $A_3^-$-singularity at the origin.

Notice that a node $(x^2-y^2=0)$ corresponds to a type $A_1^-$-singularity. A tacnode corresponds to a type $A_3^-$-singularity. In fact each type $A_{2n+1}^-$-singularity, where n ≥ 0 is an integer, corresponds to a curve with self-intersection. As n increases, the order of self-intersection increases: transverse crossing, ordinary tangency, etc.

The type $A_{2n+1}^+$-singularities are of no interest over the real numbers: they all give an isolated point. Over the complex numbers, type $A_{2n+1}^+$-singularities and type $A_{2n+1}^-$-singularities are equivalent: (x, y) → (x, iy) gives the required diffeomorphism of the normal forms.

== See also ==
- Acnode
- Cusp or Spinode
- Crunode
