= Circumcevian triangle =

Triangle derived from a given triangle and a coplanar point

In Euclidean geometry, a circumcevian triangle is a special triangle associated with a reference triangle and a point in the plane of the triangle. It is also associated with the circumcircle of the reference triangle.

== Definition ==
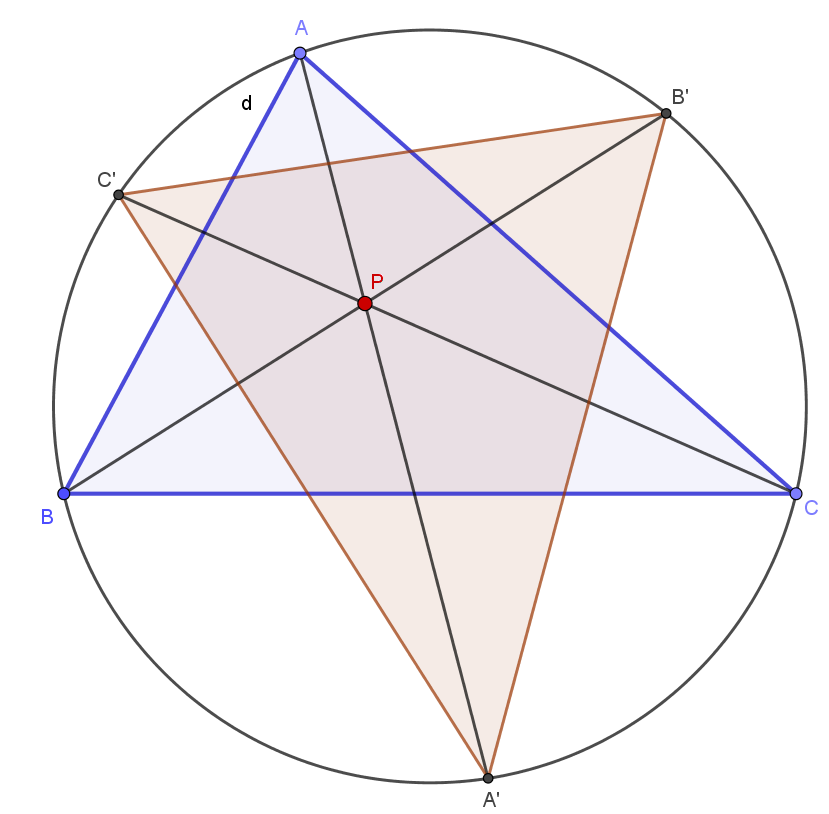
Reference triangle △ABC Point P Circumcircle of △ABC; lines between the vertices of △ABC and P Circumcevian triangle △A'B'C' of P

Let P be a point in the plane of the reference triangle △ABC. Let the lines AP, BP, CP intersect the circumcircle of △ABC at A', B', C'. The triangle △A'B'C' is called the circumcevian triangle of P with reference to △ABC.

== Coordinates ==
Let a,b,c be the side lengths of triangle △ABC and let the trilinear coordinates of P be α : β : γ. Then the trilinear coordinates of the vertices of the circumcevian triangle of P are as follows: $\begin{array}{rccccc} A' =& -a\beta\gamma &:& (b\gamma+c\beta)\beta &:& (b\gamma+c\beta)\gamma \\ B' =& (c\alpha +a\gamma)\alpha &:& - b\gamma\alpha &:& (c\alpha +a\gamma) \gamma \\ C' =& (a\beta +b\alpha)\alpha &:& (a\beta +b\alpha)\beta &:& - c\alpha\beta \end{array}$

== Some properties ==
- Every triangle inscribed in the circumcircle of the reference triangle ABC is congruent to exactly one circumcevian triangle.
- The circumcevian triangle of P is similar to the pedal triangle of P.
- The McCay cubic is the locus of point P such that the circumcevian triangle of P and ABC are orthologic.

== See also ==
- Cevian
- Ceva's theorem
