= Line coordinates =

Coordinates used to specify position of a line

In geometry, line coordinates are used to specify the position of a line just as point coordinates (or simply coordinates) are used to specify the position of a point. The idea of line coordinates is fundamental to line geometry, which is an approach to geometry where lines are taken as fundamental and indivisible objects, rather than points.

== Lines in the plane ==
There are several possible ways to specify the position of a line in the plane. A simple way is by the pair (m, b) where the equation of the line is y = mx + b. Here m is the slope and b is the y-intercept. This system specifies coordinates for all lines that are not vertical. However, it is more common and simpler algebraically to use coordinates (l, m) where the equation of the line is lx + my + 1 = 0. This system specifies coordinates for all lines except those that pass through the origin. The geometrical interpretations of l and m are the negative reciprocals of the x and y-intercept respectively.

The exclusion of lines passing through the origin can be resolved by using a system of three coordinates (l, m, n) to specify the line with the equation lx + my + n = 0. Here l and m may not both be 0. In this equation, only the ratios between l, m and n are significant, in other words if the coordinates are multiplied by a non-zero scalar then line represented remains the same. So (l, m, n) is a system of homogeneous coordinates for the line.

If points in the real projective plane are represented by homogeneous coordinates (x, y, z), the equation of the line is lx + my + nz = 0, provided (l, m, n) ≠ (0,0,0). In particular, line coordinate (0, 0, 1) represents the line z = 0, which is the line at infinity in the projective plane. Line coordinates (0, 1, 0) and (1, 0, 0) represent the x and y-axes respectively.

== Tangential equations ==
Just as f(x, y) = 0 can represent a curve as a subset of the points in the plane, the equation φ(l, m) = 0 represents a subset of the lines on the plane. The set of lines on the plane may, in an abstract sense, be thought of as the set of points in a projective plane, the dual of the original plane. The equation φ(l, m) = 0 then represents a curve in the dual plane.

For a curve f(x, y) = 0 in the plane, the tangents to the curve form a curve in the dual space called the dual curve. If φ(l, m) = 0 is the equation of the dual curve, then it is called the tangential equation, for the original curve. A given equation φ(l, m) = 0 represents a curve in the original plane determined as the envelope of the lines that satisfy this equation. Similarly, if φ(l, m, n) is a homogeneous function then φ(l, m, n) = 0 represents a curve in the dual space given in homogeneous coordinates, and may be called the homogeneous tangential equation of the enveloped curve.

Tangential equations are useful in the study of curves defined as envelopes, just as Cartesian equations are useful in the study of curves defined as loci.

== Tangential equation of a point ==
A linear equation in line coordinates has the form al + bm + c = 0, where a, b and c are constants. Suppose (l, m) is a line that satisfies this equation. If c is not 0 then lx + my + 1 = 0, where x = a/c and y = b/c, so every line satisfying the original equation passes through the point (x, y). Conversely, any line through (x, y) satisfies the original equation, so al + bm + c = 0 is the equation of set of lines through (x, y). For a given point (x, y), the equation of the set of lines though it is lx + my + 1 = 0, so this may be defined as the tangential equation of the point. Similarly, for a point (x, y, z) given in homogeneous coordinates, the equation of the point in homogeneous tangential coordinates is lx + my + nz = 0.

== Formulas ==
The intersection of the lines (l_{1}, m_{1}) and (l_{2}, m_{2}) is the solution to the linear equations

$$\begin{align}
l_1x + m_1y + 1 &= 0, \\
l_2x + m_2y + 1 &= 0.
\end{align}$$

By Cramer's rule, the solution is

$$x=\frac{m_1-m_2}{l_1m_2-l_2m_1},\quad y=-\frac{l_1-l_2}{l_1m_2-l_2m_1}.$$

The lines (l_{1}, m_{1}), (l_{2}, m_{2}), and (l_{3}, m_{3}) are concurrent when the determinant

$$\begin{vmatrix}
l_1 & m_1 & 1 \\
l_2 & m_2 & 1 \\
l_3 & m_3 & 1
\end{vmatrix}=0.$$

For homogeneous coordinates, the intersection of the lines (l_{1}, m_{1}, n_{1}) and (l_{2}, m_{2}, n_{2}) is the cross product:

$$(m_1n_2-m_2n_1,\ l_2n_1-l_1n_2,\ l_1m_2-l_2m_1).$$

The lines (l_{1}, m_{1}, n_{1}), (l_{2}, m_{2}, n_{2}) and (l_{3}, m_{3}, n_{3}) are concurrent when the determinant

$$\begin{vmatrix}
l_1 & m_1 & n_1 \\
l_2 & m_2 & n_2 \\
l_3 & m_3 & n_3
\end{vmatrix}=0.$$

Dually, the coordinates of the line containing (x_{1}, y_{1}, z_{1}) and (x_{2}, y_{2}, z_{2}) can be obtained via the cross product:
$$(y_1z_2-y_2z_1,\ x_2z_1-x_1z_2,\ x_1y_2-x_2y_1).$$

== Lines in three-dimensional space ==
For two given points in the real projective plane, (x_{1}, y_{1}, z_{1}) and (x_{2}, y_{2}, z_{2}), the three determinants

$$y_1z_2-y_2z_1,\ \
x_2z_1-x_1z_2,\ \
x_1y_2-x_2y_1,\ \$$

determine the projective line containing them.

Similarly, for two points in $\mathbb{RP}^3,$ (x_{1}, y_{1}, z_{1}, w_{1}) and (x_{2}, y_{2}, z_{2}, w_{2}), the line containing them is determined by the six determinants

$$\begin{align}
& x_1y_2-x_2y_1, && x_1w_2-x_2w_1,\\
& x_1z_2-x_2z_1, && y_1w_2-y_2w_1,\\
& y_1z_2-y_2z_1, && z_1w_2-z_2w_1.
\end{align}$$

This is the basis for a system of homogeneous line coordinates in three-dimensional space called Plücker coordinates. Six numbers in a set of coordinates only represent a line when they satisfy an additional equation. This system maps the space of lines in three-dimensional space to projective space $\mathbb{RP}^5,$ but with the additional requirement the space of lines corresponds to the Klein quadric, which is a manifold of dimension four.

More generally, the lines in n-dimensional projective space are determined by a system of n(n − 1)/2 homogeneous coordinates that satisfy a set of (n − 2)(n − 3)/2 conditions, resulting in a manifold of dimension 2n − 2.

== With complex numbers ==
Isaak Yaglom has shown how dual numbers provide coordinates for oriented lines in the Euclidean plane, and split-complex numbers form line coordinates for the hyperbolic plane. The coordinates depend on the presence of an origin and reference line on it. Then, given an arbitrary line its coordinates are found from the intersection with the reference line. The distance s from the origin to the intersection and the angle θ of inclination between the two lines are used:

- $z = \tan\!\bigl(\tfrac{\theta}{2} \bigr)\ (1 + s \epsilon)$ is the dual number for a Euclidean line, and
- $z = \tan\! \bigl(\tfrac{\theta}{2} \bigr)\ (\cosh s + j \sinh s)$ is the split-complex number for a line in the Lobachevski plane.

Since there are lines ultraparallel to the reference line in the Lobachevski plane, they need coordinates too: There is a unique common perpendicular, say s is the distance from the origin to this perpendicular, and d is the length of the segment between reference and the given line.

- $z = \tanh\!\bigl( \tfrac {d}{2}\bigr) \ (\sinh s + j \cosh s)$ denotes the ultraparallel line.

The motions of the line geometry are described with linear fractional transformations on the appropriate complex planes.

== See also ==
- Robotics conventions
- Line complex
