= Trident curve =

Curve of a specific cubic implicit function

In mathematics, a trident curve (also trident of Newton or parabola of Descartes) is any member of the family of curves that have the formula:
$$xy+ax^3+bx^2+cx=d.$$

Trident curve with a = b = c = d = 1.

Trident curve at y = ∞ with a = b = c = d = 1. This curve partially resembles the folium of Descartes.

Trident curves are cubic plane curves with an ordinary double point in the real projective plane at $x=0$, $y=1$, $z=0$. If we substitute $x=x/z$ and $y=1/z$ into the equation of the trident curve, we get
$$ax^3+bx^2z+cxz^2+xz = dz^3,$$
which has an ordinary double point at the origin. Trident curves are therefore rational plane algebraic curves of genus zero.

Solving for $y$, we get
$$y=\frac{d}{x}-ax^2-bx-c.$$

Solving for $x$, we get
$$x=\frac{d-ax^3-bx^2-cx}{y}.$$
