= Brokard's theorem =

Theorem about orthocenter and polars in circle geometry

Brokard's theorem (also known as Brocard's theorem) is a theorem on poles and polars in projective geometry commonly used in Olympiad mathematics. It is named after French mathematician Henri Brocard.

== Statement ==
Brokard's theorem. The points A, B, C, and D lie in this order on a circle $\omega$ with center O. Lines AC and BD intersect at P, AB and DC intersect at Q, and AD and BC intersect at R. Then O is the orthocenter of $\triangle PQR$. Furthermore, QR is the polar of P, PQ is the polar of R, and PR is the polar of Q with respect to $\omega$.

== See also ==
- Orthocenter
- Power of a point
- Pole and polar
