= Pole and polar =

Unique point and line of a conic section

The polar line q to a pole Q with respect to a circle centered on the point O. The point P is the inversion point of Q; the polar is the line through P that is perpendicular to the line containing O, P and Q.

In geometry, a pole and polar are respectively a point and a line that have a unique reciprocal relationship with respect to a given conic section.

Polar reciprocation in a given conic section is the transformation of each point in the plane into its polar line and each line in the plane into its pole. In projective geometry, this affords a one-to-one correspondence between points and lines in the projective plane. This correspondence respects incidence, in the sense that a point $P$ lies on a line $l$ if and only if the pole of $l$ lies on the polar of $P$.

== Properties ==
Pole and polar have several useful properties:

- If a point $P$ lies on the polar of a point $Q$, then $Q$ lies on the polar of $P$. (La Hire's theorem)
- If a point $P$ moves along a line $l$, its polar $p$ rotates about the pole $L$ of the line $l$.
- If two tangent lines can be drawn from a point to the conic section, then its polar passes through both tangent points.
- If a point lies on the conic section, then its polar is the tangent through this point to the conic section.
- If a point $P$ lies on its own polar line, then $P$ is on the conic section.
- Each line has, with respect to a non-degenerated conic section, exactly one pole; and each point has exactly one polar line.
- If a line $l$ intersects a conic $C$ at points $A$ and $B$, and $P$ is a point on $l$, then the intersection of $l$ and the polar of $P$ with respect to $C$ is the harmonic conjugate of $P$ with respect to $A$ and $B$.

== Special case of circles ==
The pole of a line q in a circle C is the point Q that is the inversion in C of the point P on q that is closest to the center of the circle (see figure to the right). Conversely, the polar of a point Q in a circle C is the line q such that its closest point P to the center of the circle is the inversion of Q in C. The polar of the circle's center is the line at infinity and the pole of that line is the circle's center. The poles of lines through the circle's center lie on the line at infinity.

If a point A lies on the polar line q of the point Q, then Q lies on the polar line a of A. This is sometimes referred to as La Hire's theorem. More generally, the polars of all the points on the line q must pass through its pole Q.

The relationship between poles and polars is reciprocal. Thus, if a point A lies on the polar line q of a point Q, then the point Q must lie on the polar line a of the point A. (La Hire's theorem) The two polar lines a and q need not be parallel.

There is another description of the polar line of a point P in the case that it lies outside the circle C. In this case, there are two lines through P which are tangent to the circle, and the polar of P is the line joining the two points of tangency (not shown here). This shows that pole and polar line are concepts in the projective geometry of the plane and generalize with any nonsingular conic in the place of the circle C.

== Polar reciprocation ==
Illustration of the duality between points and lines, and the double meaning of "incidence". If two lines a and k pass through a single point Q, then the polar q of Q joins the poles A and K of the lines a and k, respectively.

The concepts of a pole and its polar line were advanced in projective geometry. For instance, the polar line can be viewed as the set of projective harmonic conjugates of a given point, the pole, with respect to a conic. The operation of replacing every point by its polar and vice versa is known as a polarity.

A polarity is a correlation that is also an involution.

For some point P and its polar p, any other point Q on p is the pole of a line q through P. This comprises a reciprocal relationship, and is one in which incidences are preserved.

== General conic sections ==
Line p is the polar line to point P, l to L and m to M

p is the polar line to point P ; m is the polar line to M

The concepts of pole, polar and reciprocation can be generalized from circles to other conic sections which are the ellipse, hyperbola and parabola. This generalization is possible because conic sections result from a reciprocation of a circle in another circle, and the properties involved, such as incidence and the cross-ratio, are preserved under all projective transformations.

=== Calculating the polar of a point ===
A general conic section may be written as a second-degree equation in the Cartesian coordinates (x, y) of the plane

$$A_{xx} x^2 + 2 A_{xy} xy + A_{yy} y^2 + 2 B_{x} x + 2 B_{y} y + C = 0$$

where A_{xx}, A_{xy}, A_{yy}, B_{x}, B_{y}, and C are the constants defining the equation. For such a conic section, the polar line to a given pole point (ξ, η) is defined by the equation

$$D x + E y + F = 0\,$$

where D, E and F are likewise constants that depend on the pole coordinates (ξ, η)

$$\begin{align}
D &= A_{xx} \xi + A_{xy} \eta + B_{x} \\
E &= A_{xy} \xi + A_{yy} \eta + B_{y} \\
F &= B_{x} \xi + B_{y} \eta + C
\end{align}$$

=== Calculating the pole of a line ===
The pole of the line $D x + E y + F = 0$, relative to the non-degenerated conic section
$$A_{xx} x^{2} + 2 A_{xy} xy + A_{yy} y^{2} + 2 B_{x} x + 2 B_{y} y + C = 0$$
can be calculated in two steps.

First, calculate the numbers x, y and z from

$$\begin{bmatrix}
x \\ y \\ z
\end{bmatrix} = \begin{bmatrix}
A_{xx} & A_{xy} & B_{x} \\
A_{xy} & A_{yy} & B_{y} \\
B_{x}  & B_{y}  & C
\end{bmatrix}^{-1} \begin{bmatrix}
D \\ E \\ F
\end{bmatrix}$$

Now, the pole is the point with coordinates $\left( \frac{x}{z} , \frac{y}{z} \right)$

=== Tables for pole-polar relations ===
- Pole-polar relation for an ellipse
- Pole-polar relation for a hyperbola
- Pole-polar relation for a parabola

conic	equation	polar of point $P = (x_0,y_0)$
circle	$x^2 + y^2 = r^2$	$x_0 x + y_0 y = r^2$
ellipse	$\left(\frac{ x } { a }\right)^2 + \left(\frac{ y } { b }\right)^2 = 1$	$\frac{ x_0 x } { a^2 } + \frac{ y_0 y } { b^2 } = 1$
hyperbola	$\left(\frac{ x } { a }\right)^2 - \left(\frac{ y } { b }\right)^2 = 1$	$\frac{ x_0 x } { a^2 } - \frac{ y_0 y } { b^2 } = 1$
parabola	$y = a x^2$	$y+y_0 = 2ax_0x$

conic	equation	pole of line u x + v y = w
circle	$x^2 +y^2 = r^2$	$\left( \frac{ r^2 u } { w }, \; \frac{ r^2 v } { w } \right)$
ellipse	$\left(\frac{ x } { a }\right)^2 + \left(\frac{ y } { b }\right)^2 = 1$	$\left( \frac{ a^2 u } { w }, \; \frac{ b^2 v } { w } \right)$
hyperbola	$\left(\frac{ x } { a }\right)^2 - \left(\frac{ y } { b }\right)^2 = 1$	$\left( \frac{ a^2 u } { w }, \; -\frac{ b^2 v } { w } \right)$
parabola	$y = a x^2$	$\left( -\frac{ u} { 2av }, \; -\frac{ w} { v } \right)$

=== Via complete quadrangle ===
In projective geometry, two lines in a plane always intersect. Thus, given four points forming a complete quadrangle, the lines connecting the points cross in an additional three diagonal points.

Given a point Z not on conic C, draw two secants from Z through C crossing at points A, B, D, and E. Then these four points form a complete quadrangle, and Z is at one of the diagonal points. The line joining the other two diagonal points is the polar of Z, and Z is the pole of this line.

== Applications ==
Poles and polars were defined by Joseph Diaz Gergonne and play an important role in his solution of the problem of Apollonius.

In planar dynamics a pole is a center of rotation, the polar is the force line of action and the conic is the mass–inertia matrix. The pole–polar relationship is used to define the center of percussion of a planar rigid body. If the pole is the hinge point, then the polar is the percussion line of action as described in planar screw theory.

== See also ==
- Dual polygon
- Dual polyhedron
- Polar curve
- Brokard's theorem

== Bibliography ==
- Johnson RA (1960). Advanced Euclidean Geometry: An Elementary treatise on the geometry of the Triangle and the Circle. New York: Dover Publications. pp. 100–105.
- Coxeter HSM, Greitzer SL (1967). Geometry Revisited. Washington: MAA. pp. 132–136, 150. ISBN 978-0-88385-619-2.
- Gray J J (2007). Worlds Out of Nothing: A Course in the history of Geometry in the 19th century. London: Springer Verlag. pp. 21. ISBN 978-1-84628-632-2.
- Korn GA, Korn TM (1961). Mathematical Handbook for Scientists and Engineers. New York: McGraw-Hill. pp. 43–45. LCCN 59014456. The paperback version published by Dover Publications has the ISBN 978-0-486-41147-7.
- Wells D (1991). The Penguin Dictionary of Curious and Interesting Geometry. New York: Penguin Books. pp. 190–191. ISBN 0-14-011813-6.
