= Thomson cubic =

Set of points associated with a triangle's circumconic centers

The Thomson cubic (black curve) contains the point X whose isogonal conjugate (X') is on the line X(2)-X.

In geometry, the Thomson cubic of a triangle is the locus of centers of circumconics whose normals at the vertices are concurrent.

== See also ==
- Cubic plane curve § Thomson cubic
