= Acnode =

Isolated point in the solution set of a polynomial equation in two real variables

An acnode at the origin (curve described in text)

An acnode is an isolated point in the solution set of a polynomial equation in two real variables. Equivalent terms are isolated point and hermit point.

For example the equation

$$f(x,y)=y^2+x^2-x^3=0$$

has an acnode at the origin, because it is equivalent to

$$y^2 = x^2 (x-1)$$

and $x^2(x-1)$ is non-negative only when $x$ ≥ 1 or $x = 0$. Thus, over the real numbers the equation has no solutions for $x < 1$ except for (0, 0).

In contrast, over the complex numbers the origin is not isolated since square roots of negative real numbers exist. In fact, the complex solution set of a polynomial equation in two complex variables can never have an isolated point.

An acnode is a critical point, or singularity, of the defining polynomial function, in the sense that both partial derivatives $\partial f\over \partial x$ and $\partial f\over \partial y$ vanish. Further the Hessian matrix of second derivatives will be positive definite or negative definite, since the function must have a local minimum or a local maximum at the singularity.

== See also ==
- Singular point of a curve
- Crunode
- Cusp
- Tacnode
