= Orthologic triangles =

Type of symmetry between two triangles

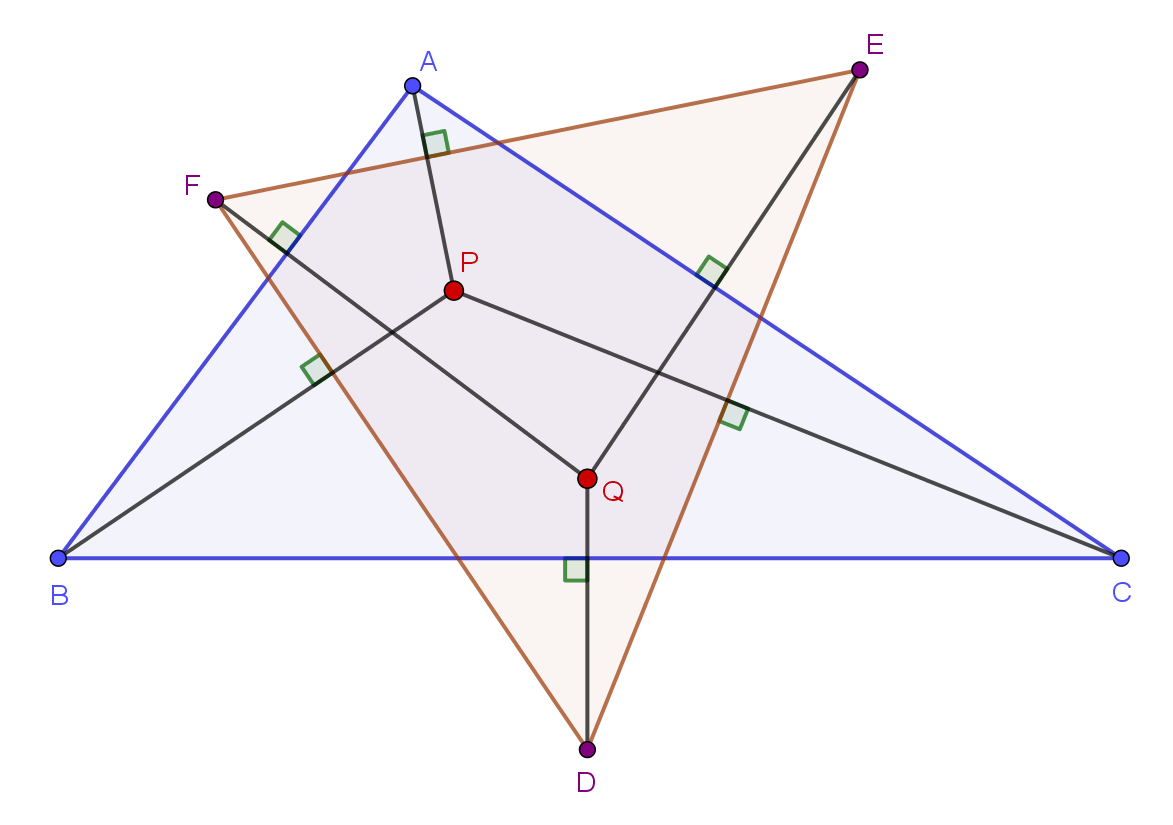
Two orthologic triangles

In geometry, two triangles are said to be orthologic if the perpendiculars from the vertices of one of them to the corresponding sides of the other are concurrent (i.e., they intersect at a single point). This is a symmetric property; that is, if the perpendiculars from the vertices A, B, C of triangle △ABC to the sides EF, FD, DE of triangle △DEF are concurrent then the perpendiculars from the vertices D, E, F of △DEF to the sides BC, CA, AB of △ABC are also concurrent. The points of concurrence are known as the orthology centres of the two triangles.

== Some pairs of orthologic triangles ==
The following are some triangles associated with the reference triangle ABC and orthologic with it.

- Medial triangle
- Anticomplementary triangle
- The triangle whose vertices are the points of contact of the incircle with the sides of ABC
- Tangential triangle
- Extouch triangle
- The triangle formed by the bisectors of the external angles of triangle ABC
- The pedal triangle of any point P in the plane of triangle ABC (and as a special case the orthic triangle)
