= Ak singularity =

Description of the degeneracy of a function

In mathematics, and in particular singularity theory, an A_{k} singularity, where k ≥ 0 is an integer, describes a level of degeneracy of a function. The notation was introduced by V. I. Arnold.

Let $f: \R^n \to \R$ be a smooth function. We denote by $\Omega (\R^n,\R)$ the infinite-dimensional space of all such functions. Let $\operatorname{diff}(\R^n)$ denote the infinite-dimensional Lie group of diffeomorphisms $\R^n \to \R^n,$ and $\operatorname{diff}(\R)$ the infinite-dimensional Lie group of diffeomorphisms $\R \to \R.$ The product group $\operatorname{diff}(\R^n) \times \operatorname{diff}(\R)$ acts on $\Omega (\R^n,\R)$ in the following way: let $\varphi : \R^n \to \R^n$ and $\psi : \R \to \R$ be diffeomorphisms and $f: \R^n \to \R$ any smooth function. We define the group action as follows:

$$(\varphi,\psi)\cdot f := \psi \circ f \circ \varphi^{-1}$$

The orbit of f , denoted orb(f), of this group action is given by

$$\mbox{orb}(f) = \{ \psi \circ f \circ \varphi^{-1} : \varphi \in \mbox{diff}(\R^n), \psi \in \mbox{diff}(\R ) \} \ .$$

The members of a given orbit of this action have the following fact in common: we can find a diffeomorphic change of coordinate in $\R^n$ and a diffeomorphic change of coordinate in $\R$ such that one member of the orbit is carried to any other. A function f is said to have a type A_{k}-singularity if it lies in the orbit of

$$f(x_1,\ldots,x_n) = 1 + \varepsilon_1x_1^2 + \cdots + \varepsilon_{n-1}x^{2}_{n-1} \pm x_n^{k+1}$$

where $\varepsilon_i = \pm 1$ and k ≥ 0 is an integer.

By a normal form we mean a particularly simple representative of any given orbit. The above expressions for f give normal forms for the type A_{k}-singularities. The type A_{k}-singularities are special because they are amongst the simple singularities, this means that there are only a finite number of other orbits in a sufficiently small neighbourhood of the orbit of f.

This idea extends over the complex numbers where the normal forms are much simpler; for example: there is no need to distinguish ε_{i} = +1 from ε_{i} = −1.

== See also ==
- Catastrophe theory § Arnold's notation, an ADE classification of singularities
