= Crunode =

Point where a curve intersects itself at an angle

A crunode at the origin of the curve defined by $y^2 - x^2(x+1)=0.$

In mathematics, a crunode (archaic; from Latin crux "cross" + node) or node of an algebraic curve is a type of singular point at which the curve intersects itself so that both branches of the curve have distinct tangent lines at the point of intersection. A crunode is also known as an ordinary double point.

In the case of a smooth real plane curve f(x, y) = 0, a point is a crunode provided that both first partial derivatives vanish

$\frac{\partial{f}}{\partial x} = \frac{\partial{f}}{\partial{y}} = 0$

and the Hessian determinant is negative:

$\frac{\partial^2 f}{\partial x^2} \frac{\partial^2 f}{\partial y^2} - \left(\frac{\partial^2 f}{\partial x ~\partial y}\right)^2 < 0.$

== See also ==
- Singular point of a curve
- Acnode
- Cusp
- Tacnode
- Saddle point
