= Cusp (singularity) =

Point on a curve where motion must move backwards

A cusp at (0, 1/2)

In mathematics, a cusp, sometimes called spinode in old texts, is a point on a curve where a moving point must reverse direction. A typical example is given in the figure. A cusp is thus a type of singular point of a curve.

For a plane curve defined by an analytic, parametric equation

$$\begin{align}
x &= f(t)\\
y &= g(t),
\end{align}$$

a cusp is a point where both derivatives of f and g are zero, and the directional derivative, in the direction of the tangent, changes sign (the direction of the tangent is the direction of the slope $\lim (g'(t)/f'(t))$). Cusps are local singularities in the sense that they involve only one value of the parameter t, in contrast to self-intersection points that involve more than one value. In some contexts, the condition on the directional derivative may be omitted, although, in this case, the singularity may look like a regular point.

For a curve defined by an implicit equation

$$F(x,y) = 0,$$

which is smooth, cusps are points where the terms of lowest degree of the Taylor expansion of F are a power of a linear polynomial; however, not all singular points that have this property are cusps. The theory of Puiseux series implies that, if F is an analytic function (for example a polynomial), a linear change of coordinates allows the curve to be parametrized, in a neighborhood of the cusp, as

$$\begin{align}
x &= at^m\\
y &= S(t),
\end{align}$$

where a is a real number, m is a positive even integer, and S(t) is a power series of order k (degree of the nonzero term of the lowest degree) larger than m. The number m is sometimes called the order or the multiplicity of the cusp, and is equal to the degree of the nonzero part of lowest degree of F. In some contexts, the definition of a cusp is restricted to the case of cusps of order two—that is, the case where m = 2.

The definitions for plane curves and implicitly defined curves have been generalized by René Thom and Vladimir Arnold to curves defined by differentiable functions: a curve has a cusp at a point if there is a diffeomorphism of a neighborhood of the point in the ambient space, which maps the curve onto one of the above-defined cusps.

== Classification in differential geometry ==
Consider a smooth real-valued function of two variables, say f (x, y) where x and y are real numbers. So f is a function from the plane to the line. The space of all such smooth functions is acted upon by the group of diffeomorphisms of the plane and the diffeomorphisms of the line, i.e. diffeomorphic changes of coordinate in both the source and the target. This action splits the whole function space up into equivalence classes, i.e. orbits of the group action.

One such family of equivalence classes is denoted by $A_k^\pm,$ where k is a non-negative integer. A function f is said to be of type $A_k^\pm$ if it lies in the orbit of $x^2 \pm y^{k+1},$ i.e. there exists a diffeomorphic change of coordinate in source and target which takes f into one of these forms. These simple forms $x^2 \pm y^{k+1}$ are said to give normal forms for the type $A_k^\pm$-singularities. Notice that the $A_{2n}^+$ are the same as the $A_{2n}^-$ since the diffeomorphic change of coordinate $(x,y) \to (x,-y)$ in the source takes $x^2 + y^{k+1}$ to $x^2 - y^{2n+1}.$ So we can drop the ± from $A_{2n}^\pm$ notation.

The cusps are then given by the zero-level-sets of the representatives of the $A_{2n}$ equivalence classes, where n ≥ 1 is an integer.

== Examples ==
A cusp in the semicubical parabola $y^2=x^3$

- An ordinary cusp is given by $x^2-y^3=0,$ i.e. the zero-level-set of a type A_{2}-singularity. Let f (x, y) be a smooth function of x and y and assume, for simplicity, that f (0, 0) = 0. Then a type A_{2}-singularity of f at (0, 0) can be characterised by:
  1. Having a degenerate quadratic part, i.e. the quadratic terms in the Taylor series of f form a perfect square, say L(x, y)^{2}, where L(x, y) is linear in x and y, and
  2. L(x, y) does not divide the cubic terms in the Taylor series of f (x, y).
- A rhamphoid cusp (from Greek 'beak-like') originally denoted a cusp such that both branches are on the same side of the tangent, such as for the curve of equation $(x-y^2)^2-y^5=0$. As such a singularity is in the same differential class as the cusp of equation $x^2-y^5=0,$ which is a singularity of type A_{4}, the term has been extended to all such singularities. These cusps are non-generic as caustics and wave fronts. The rhamphoid cusp and the ordinary cusp are non-diffeomorphic. A parametric form is $x = t^2,\, y = a t^4 + t^5,\, a \neq 0.$

For a type A_{4}-singularity we need f to have a degenerate quadratic part (this gives type A_{≥2}), that L does divide the cubic terms (this gives type A_{≥3}), another divisibility condition (giving type A_{≥4}), and a final non-divisibility condition (giving type exactly A_{4}).

To see where these extra divisibility conditions come from, assume that f has a degenerate quadratic part L^{2} and that L divides the cubic terms. It follows that the third order taylor series of f is given by $L^2 \pm LQ,$ where Q is quadratic in x and y. We can complete the square to show that $L^2 \pm LQ = (L \pm Q/2)^2 - Q^4/4.$ We can now make a diffeomorphic change of variable (in this case we simply substitute polynomials with linearly independent linear parts) so that $(L \pm Q/2)^2 - Q^4/4 \to x_1^2 + P_1$ where P_{1} is quartic (order four) in x_{1} and y_{1}. The divisibility condition for type A_{≥4} is that x_{1} divides P_{1}. If x_{1} does not divide P_{1} then we have type exactly A_{3} (the zero-level-set here is a tacnode). If x_{1} divides P_{1} we complete the square on $x_1^2 + P_1$ and change coordinates so that we have $x_2^2 + P_2$ where P_{2} is quintic (order five) in x_{2} and y_{2}. If x_{2} does not divide P_{2} then we have exactly type A_{4}, i.e. the zero-level-set will be a rhamphoid cusp.

== Applications ==
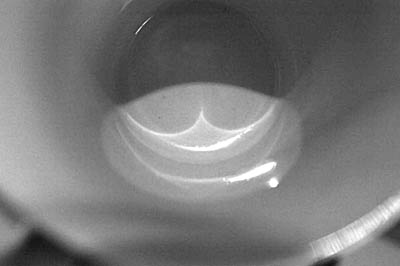
An ordinary cusp occurring as the caustic of light rays in the bottom of a teacup.

Cusps appear naturally when projecting into a plane a smooth curve in three-dimensional Euclidean space. In general, such a projection is a curve whose singularities are self-crossing points and ordinary cusps. Self-crossing points appear when two different points of the curves have the same projection. Ordinary cusps appear when the tangent to the curve is parallel to the direction of projection (that is when the tangent projects on a single point). More complicated singularities occur when several phenomena occur simultaneously. For example, rhamphoid cusps occur for inflection points (and for undulation points) for which the tangent is parallel to the direction of projection.

In many cases, and typically in computer vision and computer graphics, the curve that is projected is the curve of the critical points of the restriction to a (smooth) spatial object of the projection. A cusp appears thus as a singularity of the contour of the image of the object (vision) or of its shadow (computer graphics).

Caustics and wave fronts are other examples of curves having cusps that are visible in the real world.

== See also ==
- Cusp catastrophe
- Cardioid
