= Gallery of curves =

This is a gallery of curves used in mathematics, by Wikipedia page. See also list of curves.

== Algebraic curves ==
=== Rational curves ===
==== Degree 1 ====
Line

==== Degree 2 ====
Circle

Ellipse

Parabola

Hyperbola

==== Degree 3 ====
Cubic curve

Cubic polynomial

Folium of Descartes

Cissoid of Diocles

Conchoid of de Sluze

Cubic with double point

Strophoid

Semicubical parabola

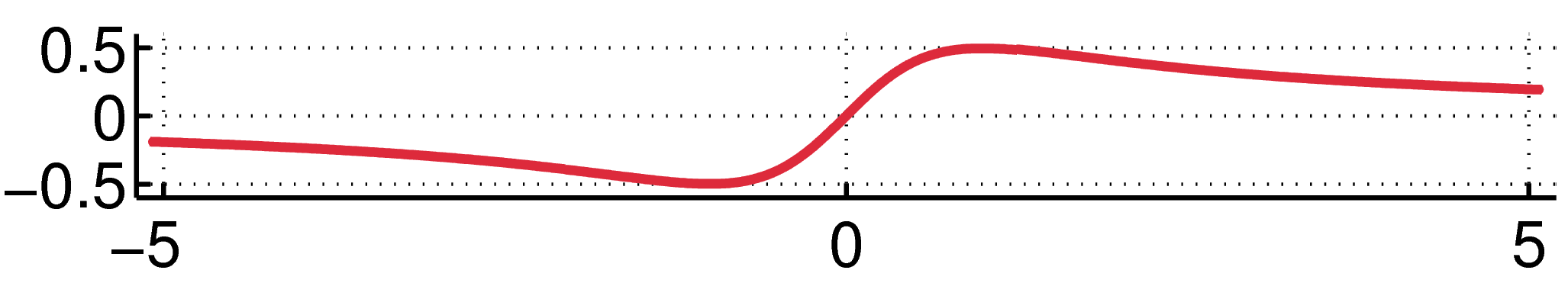
Serpentine curve

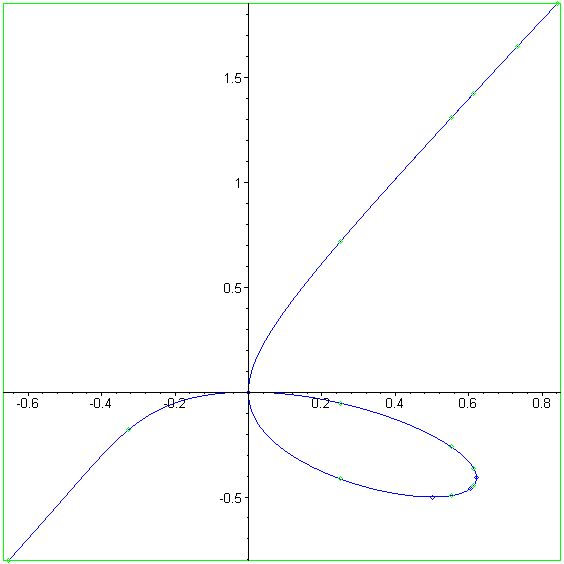
Trident curve

Trisectrix of Maclaurin

Tschirnhausen cubic

Witch of Agnesi

==== Degree 4 ====
Ampersand curve

Bean curve

Bicorn

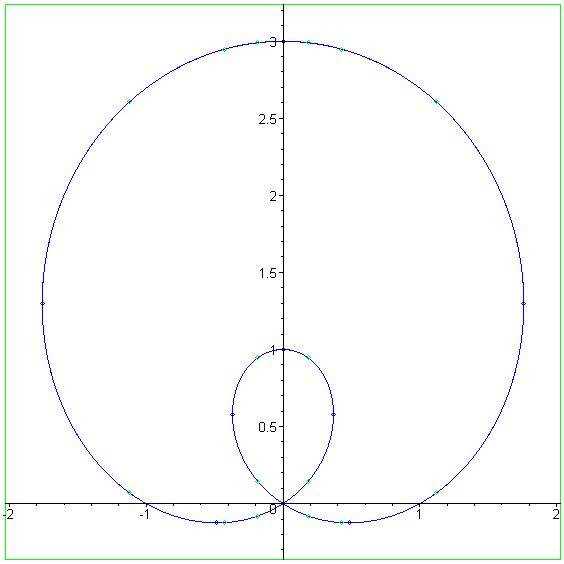
Transformed bicorn

Bicuspid curve

Bow curve

Bullet-nose curve

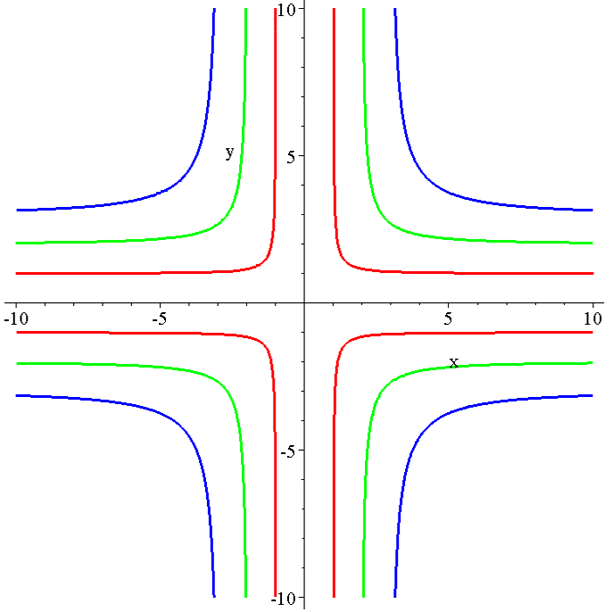
Cruciform curve

Deltoid curve

Devil's curve

Hippopede

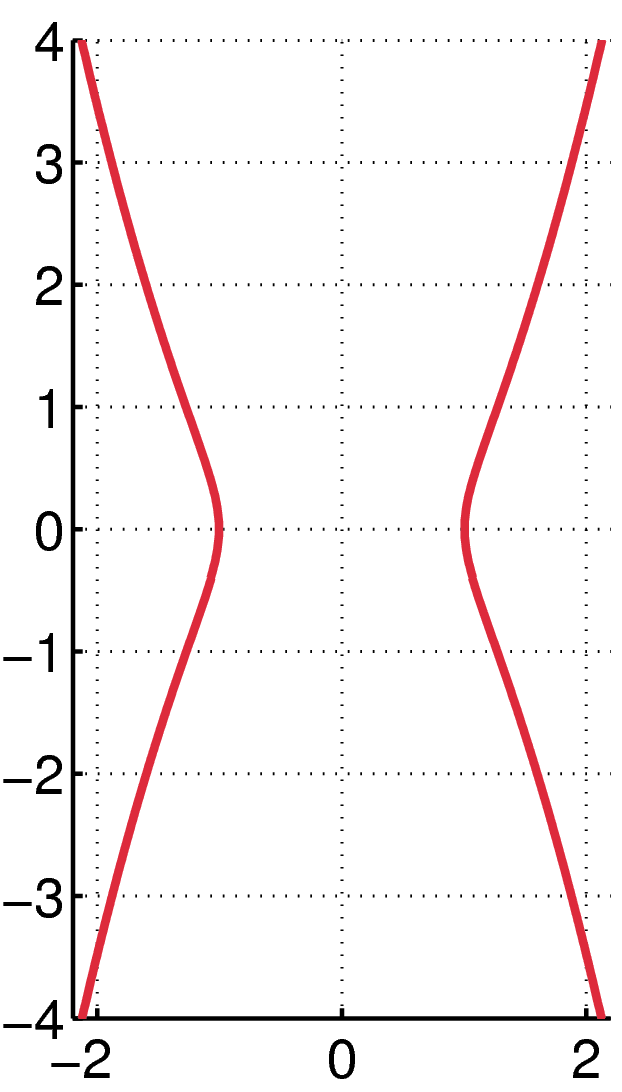
Kampyle of Eudoxus

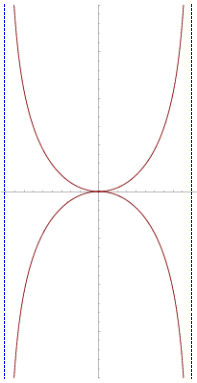
Kappa curve

Lemniscate of Booth

Lemniscate of Gerono

Lemniscate of Bernoulli

Limaçon

Cardioid

Limaçon trisectrix

Quadrifolium (2-rose)

Spiric sections

Squircle

Trifolium curve

==== Degree 6 ====
Astroid

Atriphtaloid

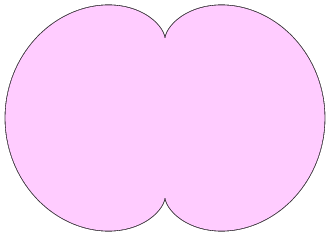
Nephroid

Quadrifolium

==== Families of variable degree ====
Epicycloid

Epispiral

Epitrochoid

Hypocycloid

Lissajous curve

Poinsot's spirals

Rose curve

=== Curves of genus one ===
Bicuspid curve

Cassini oval

Cubic curve

Elliptic curve

Watt's curve

=== Curves with genus greater than one ===
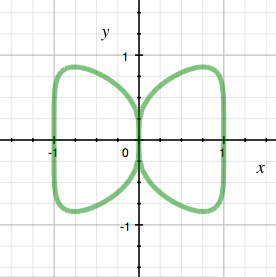
Butterfly curve (algebraic)

Elkies trinomial curves

Hyperelliptic curve

Klein quartic

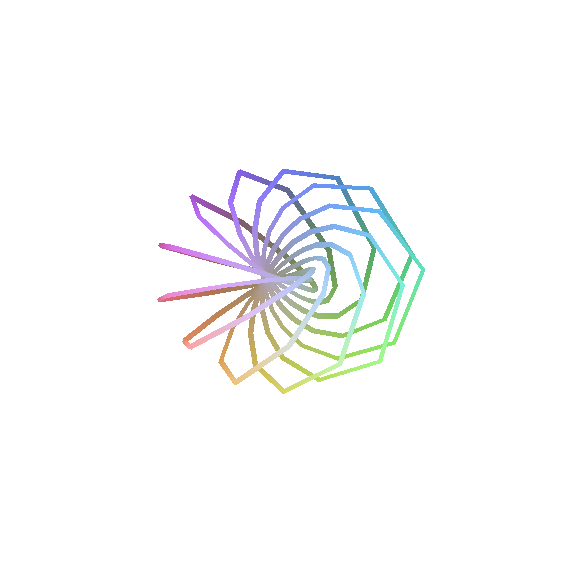
Classical modular curve

=== Curve families with variable genus ===
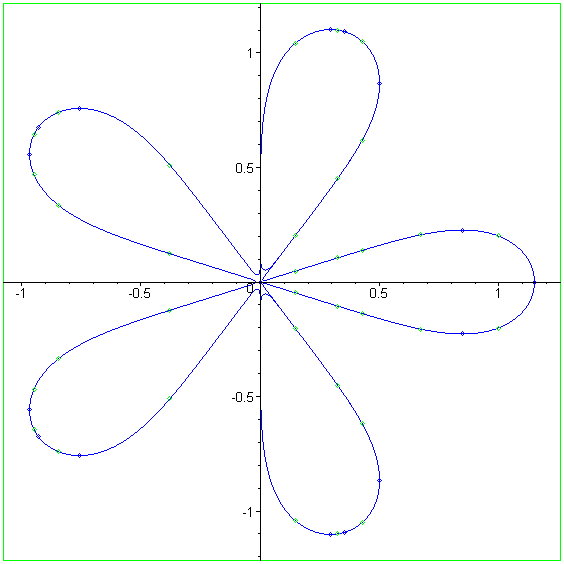
Erdős lemniscate

Hurwitz surface

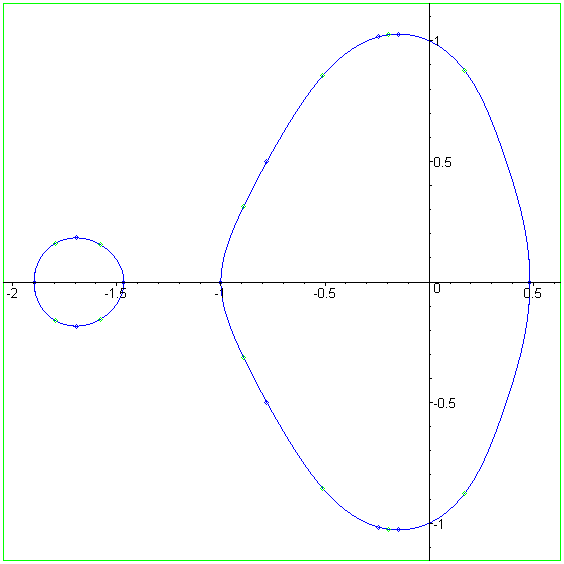
Mandelbrot curve

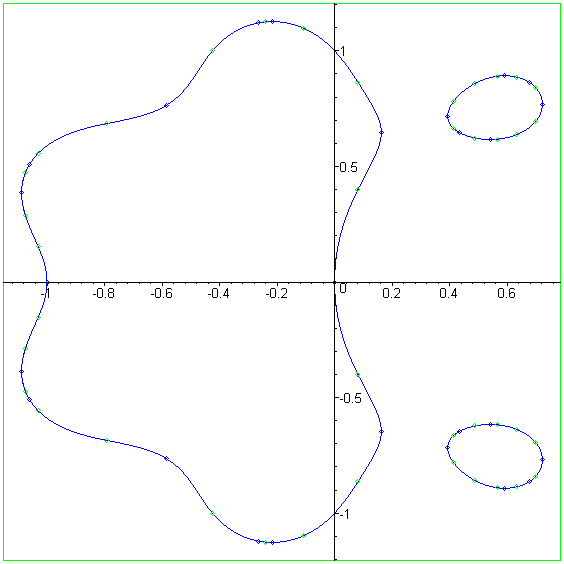
Polynomial lemniscate

Sinusoidal spiral

Superellipse

== Transcendental curves ==
Bowditch curve

Brachistochrone

Butterfly curve (transcendental)

Catenary

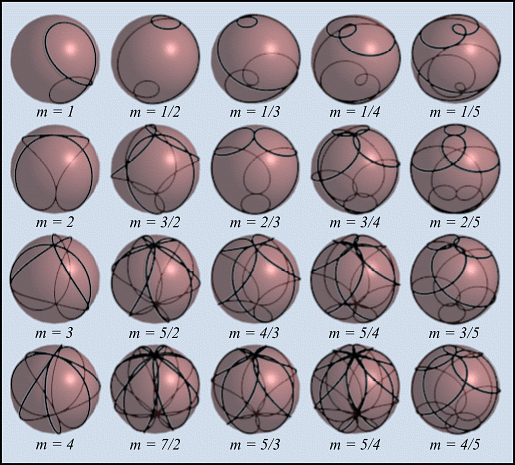
Clélies

Cochleoid

Cycloid

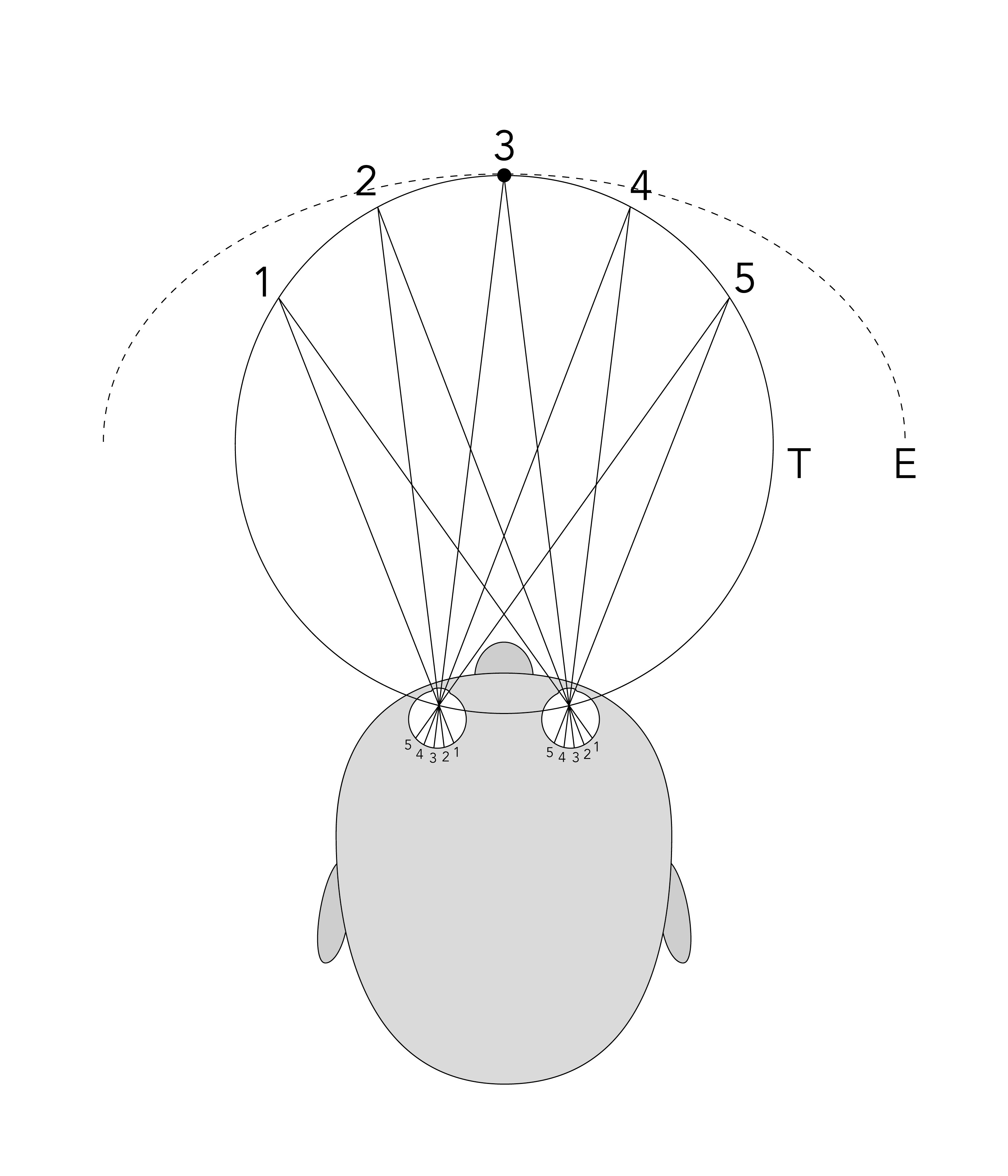
Horopter

Isochrone

Pursuit curve

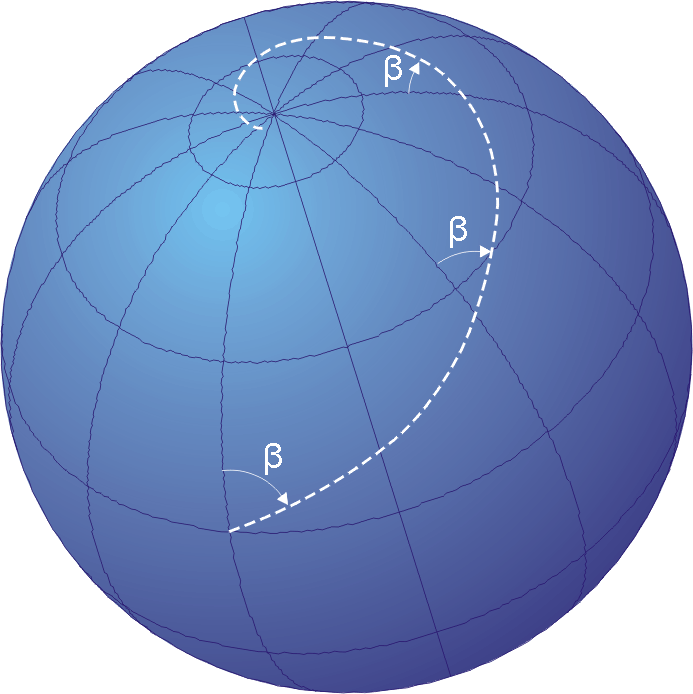
Rhumb line

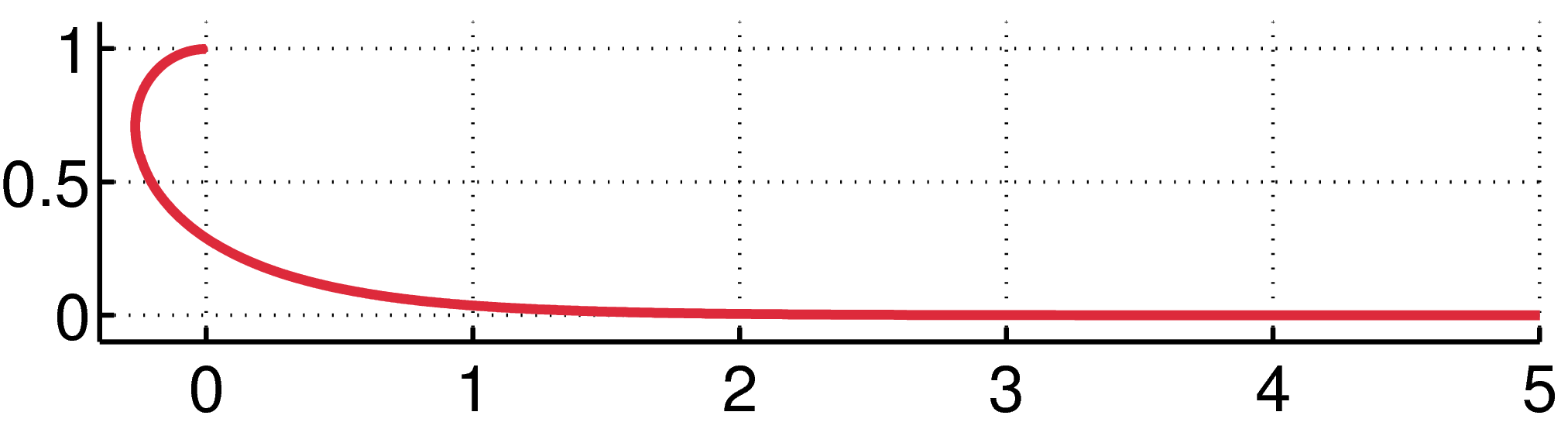
Syntractrix

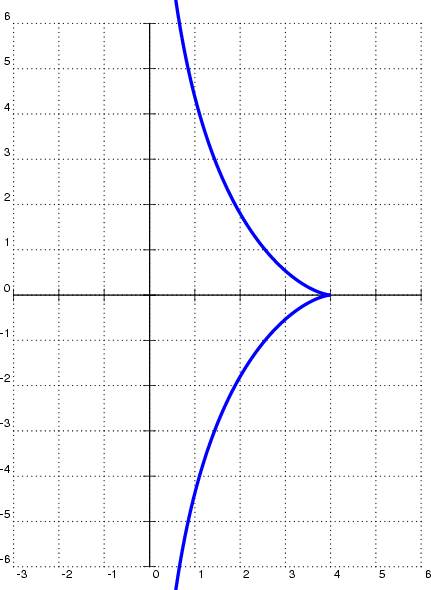
Tractrix

Trochoid

=== Spirals ===
Archimedean spiral

Cornu spiral

Fermat's spiral

Hyperbolic spiral

Lituus

Logarithmic spiral

== Piecewise constructions ==
Maurer rose

Reuleaux triangle

== Fractal curves ==
Blancmange curve

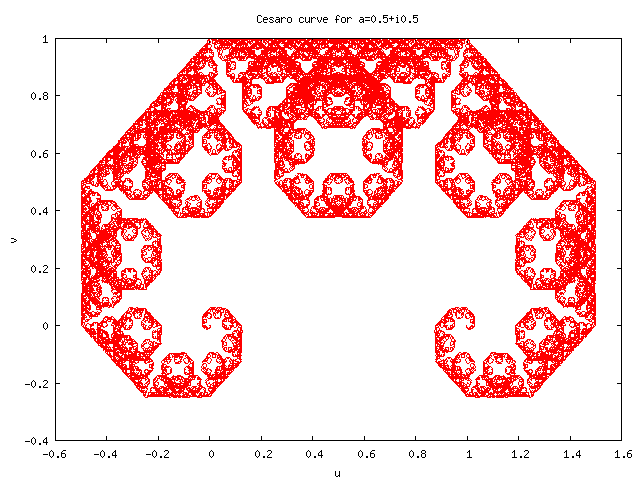
De Rham curve

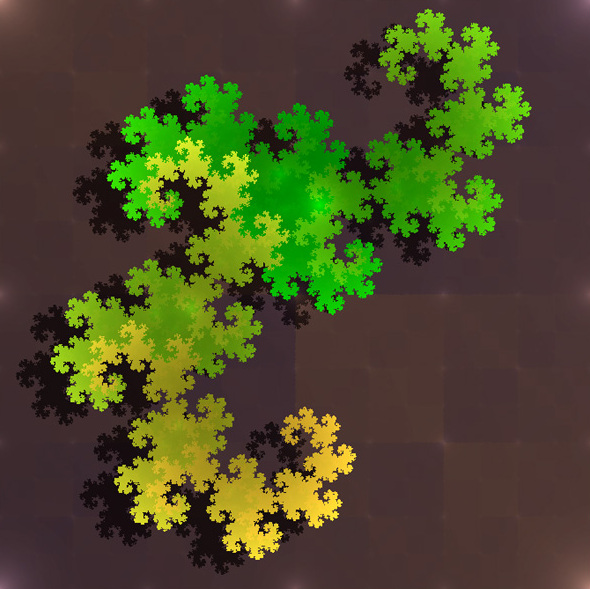
Dragon curve

Koch curve

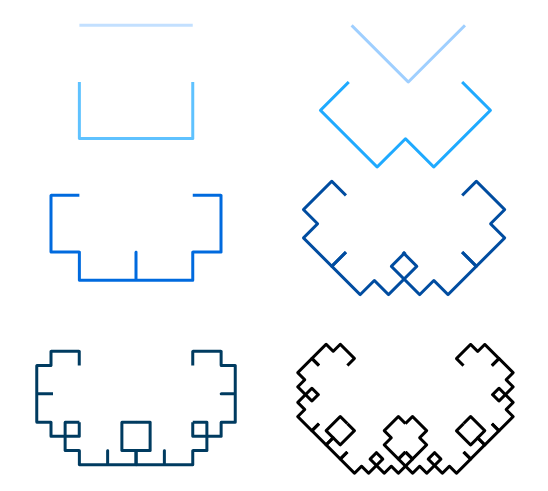
Lévy C curve

Peano curve

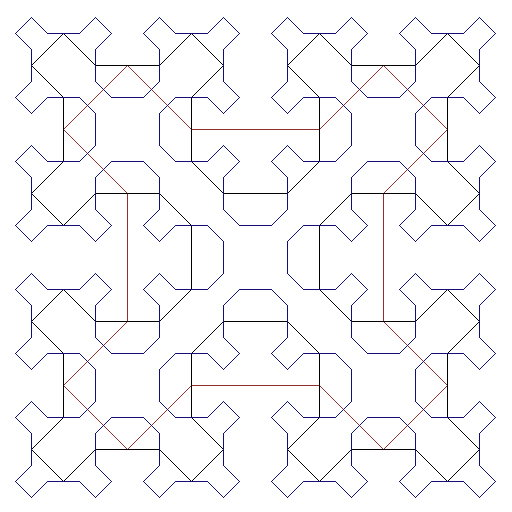
Sierpiński curve
