= Gabriel's horn =

Geometric figure which has infinite surface area but finite volume

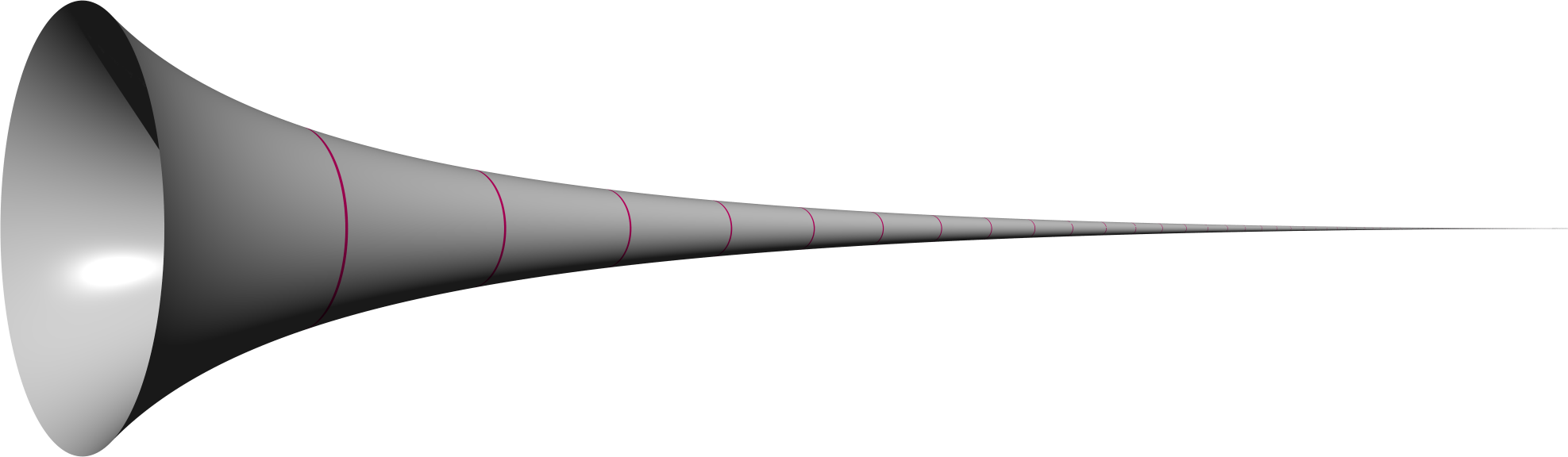
3D illustration of Gabriel's horn

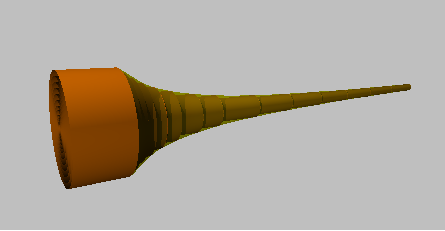
Torricelli's truncated acute hyperbolic solid with the added cylinder (in orange) used by his proof

Gabriel's horn (also called Torricelli's trumpet) is a type of geometric figure that has infinite surface area but finite volume. The name refers to the Christian idea that the archangel Gabriel will one day blow his horn to announce Judgment Day. The properties of this figure were first studied by Italian physicist and mathematician Evangelista Torricelli in the 17th century.

The names Gabriel's horn and Torricelli's trumpet were not published by Torricelli. His name for the figure appears in the Latin title of his paper De solido hyperbolico acuto, written in 1643, a truncated acute hyperbolic solid, cut by a plane. Volume 1, part 1 of his Opera geometrica published the following year included that paper and a second more orthodox (for the time) Archimedean proof of its theorem about the volume of a truncated acute hyperbolic solid. This name was used in mathematical dictionaries of the 18th century, including "Hyperbolicum Acutum" in Harris' 1704 dictionary and in Stone's 1726 one, and the French translation Solide Hyperbolique Aigu in d'Alembert's 1751 one.

Although credited with primacy by his contemporaries, Torricelli was not the first to describe an infinitely long shape with a finite volume or area. The work of Nicole Oresme in the 14th century had either been forgotten by, or was unknown to them. Oresme had posited such things as an infinitely long shape constructed by subdividing two squares of finite total area 2 using a geometric series and rearranging the parts into a figure, infinitely long in one dimension, comprising a series of rectangles.

== Mathematical definition ==
Graph of $y = 1/x$

Gabriel's horn is formed by taking the graph of
$$y = \frac{1}{x},$$
with the domain $x \ge 1$ and rotating it in three dimensions about the x axis. The discovery was made using Cavalieri's principle before the invention of calculus, but today, calculus can be used to calculate the volume and surface area of the horn between x = 1 and x = a, where a > 1. Using integration, it is possible to find the volume V and the surface area A:
$$\begin{align}
V &= \pi\int_1^a \left(\frac{1}{x}\right)^2 \,\mathrm{d}x = \pi\left(1 - \frac{1}{a}\right)\\
A &= 2\pi\int_1^a \frac{1}{x} \sqrt{1 + \left(-\frac{1}{x^2}\right)^2} \,\mathrm{d}x\\
&= 2\pi\int_1^a \frac{1}{x} \sqrt{1 + \frac{1}{x^4}} \,\mathrm{d}x\\
&> 2\pi\int_1^a \frac{1}{x}\mathrm{d}x = 2\pi \cdot  \left[\ln x \right]_{1}^{a} = 2\pi\ln a\\
\end{align}$$

The value a can be as large as required, but it can be seen from the equation that the volume of the part of the horn between x = 1 and x = a will never exceed π, but it does gradually draw nearer to π as a increases. Mathematically, the volume approaches π as a approaches infinity. Using the limit notation of calculus,
$$\lim_{a\to\infty} V = \lim_{a\to\infty} \pi\left(1 - \frac{1}{a}\right) = \pi \cdot \lim_{a\to\infty}\left(1 - \frac{1}{a}\right) = \pi.$$

The surface area formula above gives a lower bound for the area as 2π times the natural logarithm of a. There is no upper bound for the natural logarithm of a, as a approaches infinity. That means, in this case, that the horn has infinite surface area. That is to say,
$$\lim_{a\to\infty} A \ge \lim_{a\to\infty} 2\pi\ln a = \infty.$$

=== In De solido hyperbolico acuto ===
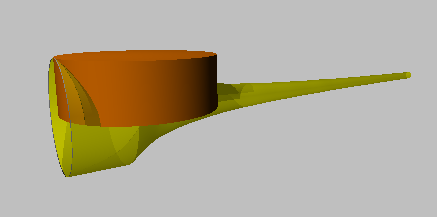
Torricelli's proof demonstrated that the volume of the truncated acute hyperbolic solid and added cylinder is the same as the volume of the red cylinder via application of Cavalieri's indivisibles, mapping cylinders from the former to circles in the latter with the range $1/b \ge y \ge 0$, which is both the height of the latter cylinder and the radius of the base in the former.

Torricelli's original non-calculus proof used an object, slightly different to the aforegiven, that was constructed by truncating the acute hyperbolic solid with a plane perpendicular to the x axis and extending it from the opposite side of that plane with a cylinder of the same base. Whereas the calculus method proceeds by setting the plane of truncation at $x = 1$ and integrating along the x axis, Torricelli proceeded by calculating the volume of this compound solid (with the added cylinder) by summing the surface areas of a series of concentric right cylinders within it along the y axis and showing that this was equivalent to summing areas within another solid whose (finite) volume was known.

In modern terminology this solid was created by constructing a surface of revolution of the function (for strictly positive b)

$$\quad{}y = \begin{cases}
\dfrac{1}{b}, & \text{where }0 \le x \le b, \\
\dfrac{1}{x}, & \text{where }b \le x.
\end{cases}$$

and Torricelli's theorem was that its volume is the same as the volume of the right cylinder with height $1/b$ and radius $\sqrt{2}$:

Theorem. An acute hyperbolic solid, infinitely long, cut by a plane [perpendicular] to the axis, together with the cylinder of the same base, is equal to that right cylinder of which the base is the latus versum (that is, the axis) of the hyperbola, and of which the altitude is equal to the radius of the basis of this acute body.

— De solido hyperbolico acuto. Evangelista Torricelli. 1643. Translated G. Loria and G. Vassura 1919.

Torricelli showed that the volume of the solid could be derived from the surface areas of this series of concentric right cylinders whose radii were $1/b \ge r \ge 0$ and heights $h = 1/r$. Substituting in the formula for the surface areas of (just the sides of) these cylinders yields a constant surface area for all cylinders of $2\pi r h = 2\pi r \times 1/r = 2\pi$. This is also the area of a circle of radius $\sqrt{2},$ and the nested surfaces of the cylinders (filling the volume of the solid) are thus equivalent to the stacked areas of the circles of radius $\sqrt{2}$ stacked from 0 to $1/b$, and hence the volume of the aforementioned right cylinder, which is known to be $V = \pi r^2 h = \pi(\sqrt{2})^2 \times 1/b = 2\pi/b$:

Propterea omnes simul superficies cylindricae, hoc est ipsum solidum acutum $ebd$, una cum cylindro basis $fedc$, aequale erit omnibus circulis simul, hoc est cylindro $acgh$. Quod erat etc.

(Therefore all the surfaces of the cylinders taken together, that is the acute solid $EBD$ itself, is the same as the cylinder of base $FEDC$, which will be equal to all its circles taken together, that is to cylinder $ACGH$.)

— De solido hyperbolico acuto. Evangelista Torricelli. 1643. Translated by Jacqueline A. Stedall, 2013.

(The volume of the added cylinder is of course $V_c = \pi r^2 \times h = \pi(1/b)^2 \times b = \pi/b$ and thus the volume of the truncated acute hyperbolic solid alone is $V_s = V - V_c = 2\pi/b - \pi/b = \pi/b$. If $b = 1$, as in the modern calculus derivation, $V_s = \pi$.)

In the Opera geometrica this is one of two proofs of the volume of the (truncated) acute hyperbolic solid. The use of Cavalieri's indivisibles in this proof was controversial at the time and the result shocking (Torricelli later recording that Gilles de Roberval had attempted to disprove it); so when the Opera geometrica was published, the year after De solido hyperbolico acuto, Torricelli also supplied a second proof based upon orthodox Archimedean principles showing that the right cylinder (height $1/b$ radius $\sqrt{2}$) was both upper and lower bound for the volume. Ironically, this was an echo of Archimedes' own caution in supplying two proofs, mechanical and geometrical, in his Quadrature of the Parabola to Dositheus.

== Apparent paradox ==
When the properties of Gabriel's horn were discovered, the fact that the rotation of an infinitely large section of the xy plane about the x axis generates an object of finite volume was considered a paradox. While the section lying in the xy plane has an infinite area, any other section parallel to it has a finite area. Thus the volume, being calculated from the "weighted sum" of sections, is finite.

Another approach is to treat the solid as a stack of disks with diminishing radii. The sum of the radii produces a harmonic series that goes to infinity. However, the correct calculation is the sum of their squares. Every disk has a radius r = 1/x and an area πr^{2} or π/x^{2}. The series Σ 1/x diverges, but the series Σ 1/x^{2} converges. In general, for any real ε > 0, the series Σ 1/x^{1+ε} converges.

The apparent paradox formed part of a dispute over the nature of infinity involving many of the key thinkers of the time, including Thomas Hobbes, John Wallis, and Galileo Galilei.

The analogue of Gabriel's horn in two dimensions has an area of 2 but infinite perimeter

There is a similar phenomenon that applies to lengths and areas in the plane. The area between the curves 1/x^{2} and −1/x^{2} from 1 to infinity is finite, but the lengths of the two curves are clearly infinite.

In lecture 16 of his 1666 Lectiones, Isaac Barrow held that Torricelli's theorem had constrained Aristotle's general dictum (from De Caelo book 1, part 6) that "there is no proportion between the finite and the infinite". Aristotle had himself, strictly speaking, been making a case for the impossibility of the physical existence of an infinite body rather than a case for its impossibility as a geometrical abstract. Barrow had been adopting the contemporary 17th-century view that Aristotle's dictum and other geometrical axioms were (as he had said in lecture 7) from "some higher and universal science", underpinning both mathematics and physics. Thus Torricelli's demonstration of an object with a relation between a finite (volume) and an infinite (area) contradicted this dictum, at least in part. Barrow's explanation was that Aristotle's dictum still held, but only in a more limited fashion when comparing things of the same type, length with length, area with area, volume with volume, and so forth. It did not hold when comparing things of two different genera (area with volume, for example) and thus an infinite area could be connected to a finite volume.

Others used Torricelli's theorem to bolster their own philosophical claims, unrelated to mathematics from a modern viewpoint. Ignace-Gaston Pardies in 1671 used the acute hyperbolic solid to argue that finite humans could comprehend the infinite, and proceeded to offer it as proof of the existences of God and immaterial souls. Since finite matter could not comprehend the infinite, Pardies argued, the fact that humans could comprehend this proof showed that humans must be more than matter, and have immaterial souls. In contrast, Antoine Arnauld argued that because humans perceived a paradox here, human thought was limited in what it could comprehend, and thus is not up to the task of disproving divine, religious, truths.

Hobbes' and Wallis' dispute was actually within the realm of mathematics: Wallis enthusiastically embracing the new concepts of infinity and indivisibles, proceeding to make further conclusions based upon Torricelli's work and to extend it to employ arithmetic rather than Torricelli's geometric arguments; and Hobbes claiming that since mathematics is derived from real world perceptions of finite things, "infinite" in mathematics can only mean "indefinite". These led to strongly worded letters by each to the Royal Society and in Philosophical Transactions, Hobbes resorting to namecalling Wallis "mad" at one point. In 1672 Hobbes tried to re-cast Torricelli's theorem as about a finite solid that was extended indefinitely, in an attempt to hold on to his contention that "natural light" (i.e. common sense) told us that an infinitely long thing must have an infinite volume. This aligned with Hobbes' other assertions that the use of the idea of a zero-width line in geometry was erroneous, and that Cavalieri's idea of indivisibles was ill-founded. Wallis argued that there existed geometrical shapes with finite area/volume but no centre of gravity based upon Torricelli, stating that understanding this required more of a command of geometry and logic "than M. Hobs [sic] is Master of". He also restructured the arguments in arithmetical terms as the sums of arithmetic progressions, sequences of arithmetic infinitesimals rather than sequences of geometric indivisibles.

Oresme had already demonstrated that an infinitely long shape can have a finite area where, as one dimension tends towards infinitely large, another dimension tends towards infinitely small. In Barrow's own words "the infinite diminution of one dimension compensates for the infinite increase of the other", in the case of the acute hyperbolic solid by the equation of the Apollonian hyperbola $xy=1$.

=== Painter's paradox ===
Since the horn has finite volume but infinite surface area, there is an apparent paradox that the horn could be filled with a finite quantity of paint and yet that paint would not be sufficient to coat its surface. However, this paradox is again only an apparent paradox caused by an incomplete definition of "paint", or by using contradictory definitions of paint for the actions of filling and painting.

One could be postulating a "mathematical" paint that is infinitely divisible (or can be infinitely thinned, or simply zero-width like the zero-width geometric lines that Hobbes took issue with) and capable of travelling at infinite speed, or a "physical" paint with the properties of paint in the real world. With either one, the apparent paradox vanishes:

With "mathematical" paint, it does not follow in the first place that an infinite surface area requires an infinite volume of paint, as infinite surface area times zero-thickness paint is indeterminate.

With physical paint, painting the outside of the solid would require an infinite amount of paint because physical paint has a non-zero thickness. Torricelli's theorem does not talk about a layer of finite width on the outside of the solid, which in fact would have infinite volume. Thus there is no contradiction between infinite volume of paint and infinite surface area to cover. It is also impossible to paint the interior of the solid, the finite volume of Torricelli's theorem, with physical paint, so no contradiction exists. This is because physical paint can only fill an approximation of the volume of the solid. The molecules do not completely tile 3-dimensional space and leave gaps, and there is a point where the "throat" of the solid becomes too narrow for paint molecules to flow down.

Physical paint travels at a bounded speed and would take an infinite amount of time to flow down. This also applies to "mathematical" paint of zero thickness if one does not additionally postulate it flowing at infinite speed.

Other different postulates of "mathematical" paint, such as infinite-speed paint that gets thinner at a fast enough rate, remove the paradox too. For volume $\pi$ of paint, as the surface area to be covered A tends towards infinity, the thickness of the paint $\pi/A$ tends towards zero. Like with the solid itself, the infinite increase of the surface area to be painted in one dimension is compensated by the infinite decrease in another dimension, the thickness of the paint.

=== Discrete version ===
"Gabriel's wedding cake" is a discrete version of Gabriel's horn, in which the continuous horn shape is approximated by an infinite series of cylinders, but shares the same overall properties as the continuous version; the name derives from the similarity to a multi-tiered wedding cake. It has been used as a teaching tool for students who are not yet familiar with calculus.

== Converse ==
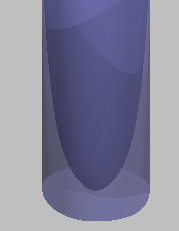
René-François de Sluse once tongue-in-cheek remarked that this solid of rotation of a (half) cissoid formed a lightweight goblet that even the heaviest drinker could not empty, because it itself has finite volume but encloses an infinite volume. It is not claimed to have a finite surface area, however.

The converse of Torricelli's acute hyperbolic solid would be a surface of revolution that has a finite surface area but an infinite volume.

In response to Torricelli's theorem, after learning of it from Marin Mersenne, Christiaan Huygens and René-François de Sluse wrote letters to each other about extending the theorem to other infinitely long solids of revolution; which have been mistakenly identified as finding such a converse.

Jan A. van Maanen, professor of mathematics at the University of Utrecht, reported in the 1990s that he once mis-stated in a conference at Kristiansand that de Sluse wrote to Huygens in 1658 that he had found such a shape:

levi opera dedicator meansura vasculi, pondere non magni, quod interim helluo nullus ebibat

(I give the measurements of a drinking glass (or vase), that has a small weight, but that even the hardest drinker could not empty.)

— de Sluse in a letter to Huygens, translation Jan A. van Maanen

to be told in response (by Tony Gardiner and Man-Keung Siu of the University of Hong Kong) that any surface of rotation with a finite surface area would of necessity have a finite volume.

Professor van Maanen realized that this was a misinterpretation of de Sluse's letter, and that what de Sluse was actually reporting that the solid "goblet" shape, formed by rotating the cissoid of Diocles and its asymptote about the y axis, had a finite volume (and hence "small weight") and enclosed a cavity of infinite volume.

Huygens first showed that the area of the rotated two-dimensional shape (between the cissoid and its asymptote) was finite, calculating its area to be 3 times the area of the generating circle of the cissoid, and de Sluse applied Pappus's centroid theorem to show that the solid of revolution thus has finite volume, being a product of that finite area and the finite orbit of rotation. The area being rotated is finite; de Sluse did not actually say anything about the surface area of the resultant rotated volume.

Such a converse essentially cannot occur:

Let D be a connected subset of $\mathbb R$. Let f be a continuously differentiable real-valued function over D. If the solid of revolution generated by revolving y = f(x) about the x-axis has finite surface area S, it also has finite volume.

Proof

First, observe that f is bounded on D. For if $\lim_{x \to a} f(x) = \pm\infty$ for some (possibly infinite) a, then there is an open neighbourhood of a on which the solid's surface area is infinite. Hence there is an M > 0 that bounds f on D: $|f(x)| < M.$

The volume is then given by
$$\begin{align}
V &= \int_D f(x) \cdot \pi f(x) \,\mathrm{d}x \\
&\le \int_D \frac{M}{2} \cdot 2\pi f(x) \,\mathrm{d}x \\
&\le \frac{M}{2} \cdot \int_D 2\pi f(x) \sqrt{1 + f'(x)^2} \,\mathrm{d}x = \frac{M}{2} \cdot S < \infty.
\end{align}$$

== See also ==
- Koch snowflake – Fractal curve
- Picard horn – Hyperbolic 3-manifold proposed as a model for the shape of the universe
- Pseudosphere – Geometric surface
- Shape of the universe – Local and global geometry of the universe
- Zeno's paradoxes – Set of philosophical problems
