= Inverse curve =

Curve created by a geometric operation

The green cardioid is obtained by inverting the red parabola across the dashed circle.

In inversive geometry, an inverse curve of a given curve C is the result of applying an inverse operation to C. Specifically, with respect to a fixed circle with center O and radius k the inverse of a point Q is the point P for which P lies on the ray OQ and OP·OQ = k^{2}. The inverse of the curve C is then the locus of P as Q runs over C. The point O in this construction is called the center of inversion, the circle the circle of inversion, and k the radius of inversion.

An inversion applied twice is the identity transformation, so the inverse of an inverse curve with respect to the same circle is the original curve. Points on the circle of inversion are fixed by the inversion, so its inverse is itself.

== Equations ==
The inverse of the point (x, y) with respect to the unit circle is (X, Y) where

$$X = \frac{x}{x^2+y^2},\qquad Y=\frac{y}{x^2+y^2},$$

or equivalently

$$x = \frac{X}{X^2+Y^2},\qquad y=\frac{Y}{X^2+Y^2}.$$

So the inverse of the curve determined by f(x, y) = 0 with respect to the unit circle is

$$f\left(\frac{X}{X^2+Y^2}, \frac{Y}{X^2+Y^2}\right)=0.$$

It is clear from this that inverting an algebraic curve of degree n with respect to a circle produces an algebraic curve of degree at most 2n.

Similarly, the inverse of the curve defined parametrically by the equations

$$x = x(t),\qquad y = y(t)$$

with respect to the unit circle is given parametrically as

$$\begin{align}
X=X(t)&=\frac{x(t)}{x(t)^2 + y(t)^2}, \\
Y=Y(t)&=\frac{y(t)}{x(t)^2 + y(t)^2}.
\end{align}$$

This implies that the circular inverse of a rational curve is also rational.

More generally, the inverse of the curve determined by f(x, y) = 0 with respect to the circle with center (a, b) and radius k is

$$f\left(a+\frac{k^2(X-a)}{(X-a)^2+(Y-b)^2}, b+\frac{k^2(Y-b)}{(X-a)^2+(Y-b)^2}\right)=0.$$

The inverse of the curve defined parametrically by

$$x = x(t),\qquad y = y(t)$$

with respect to the same circle is given parametrically as

$$\begin{align}
X=X(t)&=a+\frac{k^2\bigl(x(t)-a\bigr)}{\bigl(x(t)-a\bigr)^2 + \bigl(y(t)-b\bigr)^2}, \\
Y=Y(t)&=b+\frac{k^2\bigl(y(t)-b\bigr)}{\bigl(x(t)-a\bigr)^2 + \bigl(y(t)-b\bigr)^2}.
\end{align}$$

In polar coordinates, the equations are simpler when the circle of inversion is the unit circle. The inverse of the point (r, θ) with respect to the unit circle is (R, Θ) where

$$R = \frac{1}{r},\qquad \Theta=\theta.$$

So the inverse of the curve f(r, θ) = 0 is determined by f(1/R, Θ) = 0 and the inverse of the curve r = g(θ) is r = 1/g(θ).

== Degrees ==
As noted above, the inverse with respect to a circle of a curve of degree n has degree at most 2n. The degree is exactly 2n unless the original curve passes through the point of inversion or it is circular, meaning that it contains the circular points, (1, ±i, 0), when considered as a curve in the complex projective plane. In general, inversion with respect to an arbitrary curve may produce an algebraic curve with proportionally larger degree.

Specifically, if C is p-circular of degree n, and if the center of inversion is a singularity of order q on C, then the inverse curve will be an (n − p − q)-circular curve of degree 2n − 2p − q and the center of inversion is a singularity of order n − 2p on the inverse curve. Here q = 0 if the curve does not contain the center of inversion and q = 1 if the center of inversion is a nonsingular point on it; similarly the circular points, (1, ±i, 0), are singularities of order p on C. The value k can be eliminated from these relations to show that the set of p-circular curves of degree p + k, where p may vary but k is a fixed positive integer, is invariant under inversion.

== Examples ==
Inversion through the red circle transforms the green Archimedean spiral into the blue hyperbolic spiral and vice versa.

Applying the above transformation to the lemniscate of Bernoulli

$$\left(x^2 + y^2\right)^2 = a^2 \left(x^2 - y^2\right)$$

gives us

$$a^2\left(u^2-v^2\right) = 1,$$

the equation of a hyperbola; since inversion is a birational transformation and the hyperbola is a rational curve, this shows the lemniscate is also a rational curve, which is to say a curve of genus zero.

If we apply the transformation to the Fermat curve x^{n} + y^{n} = 1, where n is odd, we obtain

$$\left(u^2+v^2\right)^n = u^n+v^n.$$

Any rational point on the Fermat curve has a corresponding rational point on this curve, giving an equivalent formulation of Fermat's Last Theorem.

As an example involving transcendental curves, the Archimedean spiral and hyperbolic spiral are inverse curves. Similarly, the Fermat spiral and the lituus are inverse curves. The logarithmic spiral is its own inverse.

== Particular cases ==
For simplicity, the circle of inversion in the following cases will be the unit circle. Results for other circles of inversion can be found by translation and magnification of the original curve.

=== Lines ===
For a line passing through the origin, the polar equation is θ = θ_{0} where θ_{0} is fixed. This remains unchanged under the inversion.

The polar equation for a line not passing through the origin is

$$r\cos\left(\theta-\theta_0\right) = a$$

and the equation of the inverse curve is

$$r = a\cos\left(\theta-\theta_0\right)$$

which defines a circle passing through the origin. Applying the inversion again shows that the inverse of a circle passing through the origin is a line.

=== Circles ===
In polar coordinates, the general equation for a circle that does not pass through the origin (the other cases having been covered) is

$$r^2 - 2r_0 r\cos\left(\theta-\theta_0\right) + r_0^2 - a^2 = 0,\qquad(a>0,\ r>0,\ a \ne r_0)$$

where a is the radius and (r_{0}, θ_{0}) are the polar coordinates of the center. The equation of the inverse curve is then

$$1 - 2r_0 r\cos\left(\theta-\theta_0\right) + \left(r_0^2 - a^2\right)r^2 = 0,$$

or

$$r^2 - \frac{2r_0}{r_0^2 - a^2} r\cos\left(\theta-\theta_0\right) + \frac{1}{r_0^2 - a^2} = 0.$$

This is the equation of a circle with radius

$$A = \frac{a}{\left|r_0^2 - a^2\right|}$$

and center whose polar coordinates are

$$\left(R_0, \Theta_0\right) = \left(\frac{r_0}{r_0^2 - a^2}, \theta_0\right).$$

Note that R_{0} may be negative.

If the original circle intersects with the unit circle, then the centers of the two circles and a point of intersection form a triangle with sides 1, a, r_{0} this is a right triangle, i.e. the radii are at right angles, exactly when

$$r_0^2 = a^2 + 1.$$

But from the equations above, the original circle is the same as the inverse circle exactly when

$$r_0^2 - a^2 = 1.$$

So the inverse of a circle is the same circle if and only if it intersects the unit circle at right angles.

To summarize and generalize this and the previous section:

1. The inverse of a line or a circle is a line or a circle.
2. If the original curve is a line then the inverse curve will pass through the center of inversion. If the original curve passes through the center of inversion then the inverted curve will be a line.
3. The inverted curve will be the same as the original exactly when the curve intersects the circle of inversion at right angles.

=== Parabolas with center of inversion at the vertex ===
The equation of a parabola is, up to similarity, translating so that the vertex is at the origin and rotating so that the axis is horizontal, x = y^{2}. In polar coordinates this becomes

$$r=\frac{\cos\theta}{\sin^2\theta}.$$

The inverse curve then has equation

$$r=\frac{\sin^2\theta}{\cos\theta} = \sin\theta \tan\theta$$

which is the cissoid of Diocles.

=== Conic sections with center of inversion at a focus ===
The polar equation of a conic section with one focus at the origin is, up to similarity

$$r = \frac{1}{1 + e \cos \theta},$$

where e is the eccentricity. The inverse of this curve will then be

$$r = 1 + e \cos \theta,$$

which is the equation of a limaçon of Pascal. When e = 0 this is the circle of inversion. When 0 < e < 1 the original curve is an ellipse and the inverse is a simple closed curve with an acnode at the origin. When e = 1 the original curve is a parabola and the inverse is the cardioid which has a cusp at the origin. When e > 1 the original curve is a hyperbola and the inverse forms two loops with a crunode at the origin.

=== Ellipses and hyperbolas with center of inversion at a vertex ===
The general equation of an ellipse or hyperbola is

$$\frac{x^2}{a^2}\pm\frac{y^2}{b^2}=1.$$

Translating this so that the origin is one of the vertices gives

$$\frac{(x-a)^2}{a^2}\pm\frac{y^2}{b^2}=1$$

and rearranging gives

$$\frac{x^2}{2a}\pm\frac{ay^2}{2b^2}=x$$

or, changing constants,

$$cx^2+dy^2=x.$$

Note that parabola above now fits into this scheme by putting c = 0 and d = 1. The equation of the inverse is

$$\frac{cx^2}{\left(x^2+y^2\right)^2}+\frac{dy^2}{\left(x^2+y^2\right)^2}=\frac{x}{x^2+y^2}$$

or

$$x\left(x^2+y^2\right) = cx^2+dy^2.$$

This equation describes a family of curves called the conchoids of de Sluze. This family includes, in addition to the cissoid of Diocles listed above, the trisectrix of Maclaurin (d = −c/3) and the right strophoid (d = −c).

=== Ellipses and hyperbolas with center of inversion at the center ===
Inverting the equation of an ellipse or hyperbola

$$cx^2+dy^2=1$$

gives

$$\left(x^2+y^2\right)^2=cx^2+dy^2$$

which is the hippopede. When d = −c this is the lemniscate of Bernoulli.

=== Conics with arbitrary center of inversion ===
Applying the degree formula above, the inverse of a conic (other than a circle) is a circular cubic if the center of inversion is on the curve, and a bicircular quartic otherwise. Conics are rational so the inverse curves are rational as well. Conversely, any rational circular cubic or rational bicircular quartic is the inverse of a conic. In fact, any such curve must have a real singularity and taking this point as a center of inversion, the inverse curve will be a conic by the degree formula.

== Anallagmatic curves ==
An anallagmatic curve is one which inverts into itself. Examples include the circle, cardioid, oval of Cassini, strophoid, and trisectrix of Maclaurin.

== See also ==
- Inversive geometry
- Inversion of curves and surfaces (German)
