= Cisoid =

Cisoid may refer to:

- Cisoid (chemistry), form of geometric isomer in chemistry
- Cisoid (mathematics), complex sinusoid function
- Cisgender, being the same gender one was born as

== See also ==
- Cisoidal (disambiguation)
- Cosinusoid
- Sinusoid
- Cissoid
- Transoid
