= Conchoid =

Conchoid can refer to:

- Conchoid (mathematics), an equation of a curve discovered by the mathematician Nicomedes
- Conchoidal fracture, a breakage pattern characteristic to certain glasses and crystals
