= Cisoidal =

Cisoidal may refer to:

- Cisoidal (mathematics), a term used in mathematics related to cis x = cos x + i sin x
- Cisoidal (chemistry), a term used in chemistry concerning the spatial arrangement of atoms within molecules

== See also ==
- Cisoid (disambiguation)
- Cissoid
- Cosinusoidal
- Sinusoidal
- Transoidal
