= René-François de Sluse =

Walloon mathematician and churchman

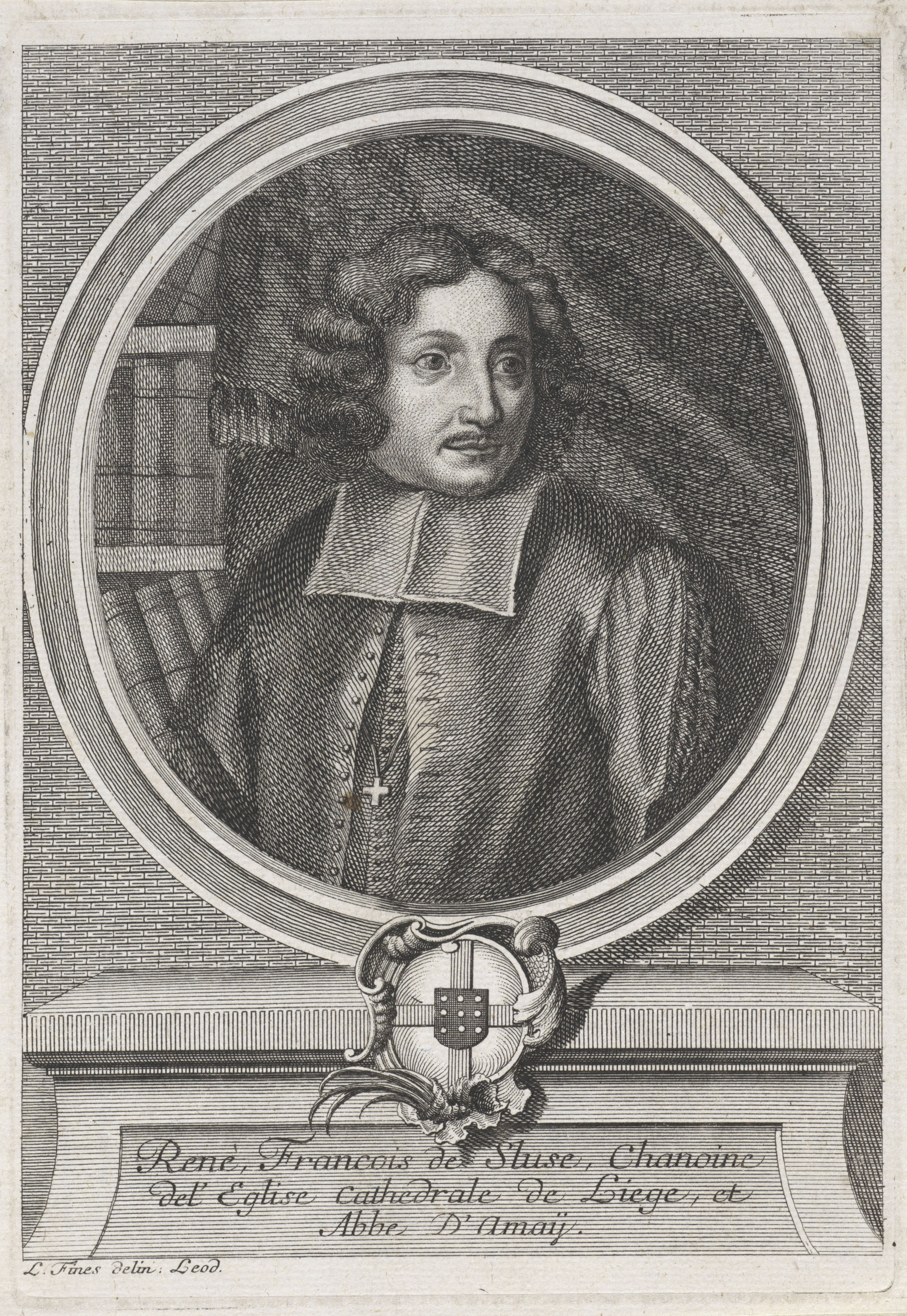
- Born: 2 July 1622; Visé, Spanish Netherlands
- Died: 19 March 1685 (aged 62); Liège, Spanish Netherlands
- Occupations: mathematician and churchman

René-François Walter de Sluse (French: [də slyz]; also Renatus Franciscus Slusius or Walther de Sluze; 2 July 1622 – 19 March 1685) was a Walloon mathematician and clergyman who was a canon of Saint Lambert's Cathedral, Liège and abbé of Amay.

== Biography ==
He was born in Visé, Prince-Bishopric of Liège (in present-day Belgium), and studied at the University of Leuven (1638–1642) before becoming doctor of laws of the Sapienza University of Rome in 1643. He spent a total of ten years in Italy, at Rome, Perugia and Florence, studying several languages, mathematics, and astronomy. Aside from mathematics he also produced works on astronomy, physics, natural history, general history, and theological subjects related to his work in the Church. His most important publication, Mesolabum, was printed in 1659, with a second edition in 1668.

Sluse became a canon of Liège cathedral in 1650, a privy councillor on 22 March 1659, abbé of Amay in 1666, an ordinary councillor to Prince-Bishop Maximilian Henry of Bavaria on 20 October 1666, and vice-provost of the cathedral on 20 January 1676. His responsibilities prevented him from visiting other mathematicians, but he corresponded with many of the thinkers of the day, including Blaise Pascal, Christiaan Huygens, Henry Oldenburg, John Wallis, and Michelangelo Ricci. He was elected a Fellow of the Royal Society in 1674. He died in Liège on 19 March 1685.

== Mathematical contributions ==
Sluse contributed to the development of calculus, focusing upon spirals, tangents, turning points and points of inflection. He and Johannes Hudde found algebraic algorithms for finding tangents, minima and maxima that were later utilized by Isaac Newton. These algorithms greatly improved upon the complicated algebraic methods of Pierre de Fermat and René Descartes, who themselves had improved upon Roberval's kinematic, but geometric, non-algorithmic methods of determining tangents.

Augustus De Morgan has the following to say about de Sluse's contribution to Newton's method of fluxions in his discussion of the Leibniz–Newton calculus controversy:

When they state that Collins had been four years in circulating the letter in which the method of fluxions was sufficiently described to any intelligent person, they suppress two facts: first, that the letter itself was in consequence of Newton's learning that Sluse had a method of tangents; secondly, that it revealed no more than Sluse had done. ...this method of Sluse is never allowed to appear ...Sluse wrote an account of the method which he had previously signified to Collins, for the Royal Society, for whom it was printed. The rule is precisely that of Newton... To have given this would have shown the world that the grand communication which was asserted to have been sent to Leibniz in June 1676 might have been seen in print, and learned from Sluse, at any time in the previous years: accordingly it was buried under reference. ...Leibniz had seen Hudde at Amsterdam, and had found that Hudde was in possession of even more than Sluse.

He found for the subtangent of a curve

f(x, y) = 0

an expression equivalent to

$${-y {\partial f \over \partial y} \over {\partial f \over \partial x}}.$$

He also wrote numerous tracts, and in particular discussed at some length spirals and points of inflexion. The Conchoid of de Sluze is named after him. He is described by John Wallis in his Algebra as "a very accurate and ingenious person." Several of his works were included in the Transactions of the Royal Society, e.g. his method of drawing tangents to geometrical curves.

== See also ==
- List of Roman Catholic scientist-clerics
