= Conchoid (mathematics) =

Curve traced by a line as it slides along another curve about a fixed point

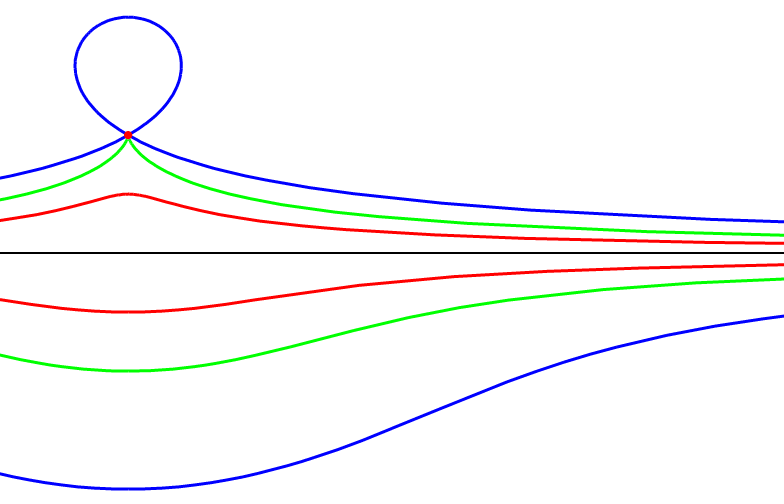
Conchoids of line with common center. Fixed point O Given curve Each pair of coloured curves is length d from the intersection with the line that a ray through O makes. d > distance of O from the line d = distance of O from the line d < distance of O from the line

Conchoid of Nicomedes drawn by an apparatus illustrated in Eutocius' Commentaries on the works of Archimedes

In geometry, a conchoid is a curve derived from a fixed point O, another curve, and a length d. It was invented by the ancient Greek mathematician Nicomedes.

== Description ==
For every line through O that intersects the given curve at A the two points on the line which are d from A are on the conchoid. The conchoid is, therefore, the cissoid of the given curve and a circle of radius d and center O. They are called conchoids because the shape of their outer branches resembles conch shells.

The simplest expression uses polar coordinates with O at the origin. If

$$r=\alpha(\theta)$$

expresses the given curve, then

$$r=\alpha(\theta)\pm d$$

expresses the conchoid.

If the curve is a line, then the conchoid is the conchoid of Nicomedes.

For instance, if the curve is the line x = a, then the line's polar form is r = a sec θ and therefore the conchoid can be expressed parametrically as

$$x=a \pm d \cos \theta,\, y=a \tan \theta \pm d \sin \theta.$$

A limaçon is a conchoid with a circle as the given curve.

The so-called conchoid of de Sluze and conchoid of Dürer are not actually conchoids. The former is a strict cissoid and the latter a construction more general yet.

== See also ==
- Cissoid
- Strophoid
