= Tractrix =

Curve traced by a point on a rod as one end is dragged along a line

Tractrix created by the end of a pole (lying flat on the ground). Its other end is first pushed then dragged by a finger as it spins out to one side.

In geometry, a tractrix (from Latin trahere 'to pull, drag'; plural: tractrices) is the curve along which an object moves, under the influence of friction, when pulled on a horizontal plane by a line segment attached to a pulling point (the tractor) that moves at a right angle to the initial line between the object and the puller at an infinitesimal speed. It is therefore a curve of pursuit. It was first introduced by Claude Perrault in 1670, and later studied by Isaac Newton (1676) and Christiaan Huygens (1693).

== Mathematical derivation ==
Tractrix with object initially at (4, 0)

Suppose the object is placed at (a, 0) and the puller at the origin, so that a is the length of the pulling thread. (In the example shown to the right, the value of a is 4.) Suppose the puller starts to move along the y axis in the positive direction. At every moment, the thread will be tangent to the curve described by the object, so that it becomes completely determined by the movement of the puller. Mathematically, if the coordinates of the object are (x, y), then by the Pythagorean theorem the y-coordinate of the puller is $y + \sqrt{a^2 - x^2}$ . Writing that the slope of thread equals that of the tangent to the curve leads to the differential equation

$$\frac{dy}{dx} = -\frac{\sqrt{a^2-x^2}}{x}$$

with the initial condition y(a) = 0. Its solution is

$$y = \int_x^a \frac{\sqrt{a^2-t^2}}{t}\,dt = \!  a\ln{\frac{a+\sqrt{a^2-x^2}}{x}}-\sqrt{a^2-x^2} .$$

If instead the puller moves downward from the origin, then the sign should be removed from the differential equation and therefore inserted into the solution. Each of the two solutions defines a branch of the tractrix; they meet at the cusp point (a, 0).

The first term of this solution can also be written

$$a \operatorname{arsech}\frac{x}{a},$$

where arsech is the inverse hyperbolic secant function.

== Basis of the tractrix ==
The essential property of the tractrix is constancy of the distance between a point P on the curve and the intersection of the tangent line at P with the asymptote of the curve.

The tractrix might be regarded in a multitude of ways:

1. It is the locus of the center of a hyperbolic spiral rolling (without skidding) on a straight line.
2. It is the involute of the catenary function, which describes a fully flexible, inelastic, homogeneous string attached to two points that is subjected to a gravitational field. The catenary has the equation y(x) = a cosh x/a.
3. The trajectory determined by the middle of the back axle of a car pulled by a rope at a constant speed and with a constant direction (initially perpendicular to the vehicle).
4. It is a (non-linear) curve which a circle of radius a rolling on a straight line, with its center at the x axis, intersects perpendicularly at all times.

The function admits a horizontal asymptote. The curve is symmetrical with respect to the y-axis. The curvature radius is r = a cot x/y.

A great implication that the tractrix had was the study of its surface of revolution about its asymptote: the pseudosphere. Studied by Eugenio Beltrami in 1868, as a surface of constant negative Gaussian curvature, the pseudosphere is a local model of hyperbolic geometry. The idea was carried further by Kasner and Newman in their book Mathematics and the Imagination, where they show a toy train dragging a pocket watch to generate the tractrix.

== Properties ==
Catenary as evolute of a tractrix

- The curve can be parameterised by the equation $x = a(t - \tanh(t)), y= a/{\cosh(t)}$.
- Due to the geometrical way it was defined, the tractrix has the property that the segment of its tangent, between the asymptote and the point of tangency, has constant length a.
- The arc length of one branch between x = x_{1} and x = x_{2} is a ln y_{1}/y_{2}.
- The area between the tractrix and its asymptote is (π a^{2})/2, which can be found using integration or Mamikon's theorem.
- The envelope of the normals of the tractrix (that is, the evolute of the tractrix) is the catenary (or chain curve) given by y = a cosh x/a.
- The surface of revolution created by revolving a tractrix about its asymptote is a pseudosphere.
- The tractrix is a transcendental curve; it cannot be defined by a polynomial equation.

== Practical application ==
In 1927, P. G. A. H. Voigt patented a horn loudspeaker design based on the assumption that a wave front traveling through the horn is spherical of a constant radius. The idea is to minimize distortion caused by internal reflection of sound within the horn. The resulting shape is the surface of revolution of a tractrix. Voigt's design removed the annoying "honk" characteristic from previous horn designs, especially conical horns, and thus revitalized interest in the horn loudspeaker. Klipsch Audio Technologies has used the tractrix design for the great majority of their loudspeakers, and many loudspeaker designers returned to the tractrix in the 21st century, creating an audiophile market segment. The tractrix horn differs from the more common exponential horn in that it provides for a wider spread of high frequency energy, and it supports the lower frequencies more strongly.

An important application is in the forming technology for sheet metal. In particular a tractrix profile is used for the corner of the die on which the sheet metal is bent during deep drawing.

A toothed belt-pulley design provides improved efficiency for mechanical power transmission using a tractrix catenary shape for its teeth. This shape minimizes the friction of the belt teeth engaging the pulley, because the moving teeth engage and disengage with minimal sliding contact. Original timing belt designs used simpler trapezoidal or circular tooth shapes, which cause significant sliding and friction.

== Drawing machines ==
- In October–November 1692, Christiaan Huygens described three tractrix-drawing machines.
- In 1693 Gottfried Wilhelm Leibniz devised a "universal tractional machine" which, in theory, could integrate any first order differential equation. The concept was an analog computing mechanism implementing the tractional principle. The device was impractical to build with the technology of Leibniz's time, and was never realized.
- In 1706 John Perks built a tractional machine in order to realise the hyperbolic quadrature.
- In 1729 Giovanni Poleni built a tractional device that enabled logarithmic functions to be drawn.

A history of all these machines can be seen in an article by H. J. M. Bos.

== See also ==
- Cissoid of Diocles, an algebraic curve that resembles the tractrix
- Dini's surface
- Hyperbolic functions for tanh, sech, csch, arcosh
- Natural logarithm for ln
- Sign function for sgn
- Trigonometric functions for sin, cos, tan, arccot, csc
