= Cissoid =

Plane curve constructed from two other curves and a fixed point

Cissoid Curve C_{1} Curve C_{2} Pole O

In geometry, a cissoid (/ˈsɪsɔɪd/; from Ancient Greek κισσοειδής (kissoeidēs) 'ivy-shaped') is a plane curve generated from two given curves C_{1}, C_{2} and a point O (the pole). Let L be a variable line passing through O and intersecting C_{1} at P_{1} and C_{2} at P_{2}. Let P be the point on L so that $\overline{OP} = \overline{P_1 P_2}.$ (There are actually two such points but P is chosen so that P is in the same direction from O as P_{2} is from P_{1}.) Then the locus of such points P is defined to be the cissoid of the curves C_{1}, C_{2} relative to O.

Slightly different but essentially equivalent definitions are used by different authors. For example, P may be defined to be the point so that $\overline{OP} = \overline{OP_1} + \overline{OP_2}.$ This is equivalent to the other definition if C_{1} is replaced by its reflection through O. Or P may be defined as the midpoint of P_{1} and P_{2}; this produces the curve generated by the previous curve scaled by a factor of 1/2.

== Equations ==
If C_{1} and C_{2} are given in polar coordinates by $r=f_1(\theta)$ and $r=f_2(\theta)$ respectively, then the equation $r=f_2(\theta)-f_1(\theta)$ describes the cissoid of C_{1} and C_{2} relative to the origin. However, because a point may be represented in multiple ways in polar coordinates, there may be other branches of the cissoid which have a different equation. Specifically, C_{1} is also given by
$$\begin{align}
& r=-f_1(\theta+\pi) \\
& r=-f_1(\theta-\pi) \\
& r=f_1(\theta+2\pi) \\
& r=f_1(\theta-2\pi) \\
& \qquad \qquad \vdots
\end{align}$$
So the cissoid is actually the union of the curves given by the equations
$$\begin{align}
& r=f_2(\theta)-f_1(\theta) \\
& r=f_2(\theta)+f_1(\theta+\pi) \\
&r=f_2(\theta)+f_1(\theta-\pi) \\
& r=f_2(\theta)-f_1(\theta+2\pi) \\
& r=f_2(\theta)-f_1(\theta-2\pi) \\
& \qquad \qquad \vdots
\end{align}$$
It can be determined on an individual basis depending on the periods of f_{1} and f_{2}, which of these equations can be eliminated due to duplication.

Ellipse $r=\frac{1}{2-\cos \theta}$ in red, with its two cissoid branches in black and blue (origin)

For example, let C_{1} and C_{2} both be the ellipse
$$r=\frac{1}{2-\cos \theta}.$$
The first branch of the cissoid is given by
$$r=\frac{1}{2-\cos \theta}-\frac{1}{2-\cos \theta}=0,$$
which is simply the origin. The ellipse is also given by
$$r=\frac{-1}{2+\cos \theta},$$
so a second branch of the cissoid is given by
$$r=\frac{1}{2-\cos \theta}+\frac{1}{2+\cos \theta}$$
which is an oval shaped curve.

If each C_{1} and C_{2} are given by the parametric equations
$$x = f_1(p),\ y = px$$
and
$$x = f_2(p),\ y = px,$$
then the cissoid relative to the origin is given by
$$x = f_2(p)-f_1(p),\ y = px.$$

== Specific cases ==
When C_{1} is a circle with center O then the cissoid is conchoid of C_{2}.

When C_{1} and C_{2} are parallel lines then the cissoid is a third line parallel to the given lines.

=== Hyperbolas ===
Let C_{1} and C_{2} be two non-parallel lines and let O be the origin. Let the polar equations of C_{1} and C_{2} be
$$r=\frac{a_1}{\cos (\theta-\alpha_1)}$$
and
$$r=\frac{a_2}{\cos (\theta-\alpha_2)}.$$
By rotation through angle $\tfrac{\alpha_1-\alpha_2}{2},$ we can assume that $\alpha_1 = \alpha,\ \alpha_2 = -\alpha.$ Then the cissoid of C_{1} and C_{2} relative to the origin is given by
$$\begin{align}
r & = \frac{a_2}{\cos (\theta+\alpha)} - \frac{a_1}{\cos (\theta-\alpha)} \\
& =\frac{a_2\cos (\theta-\alpha)-a_1\cos (\theta+\alpha)}{\cos (\theta+\alpha)\cos (\theta-\alpha)} \\
& =\frac{(a_2\cos\alpha-a_1\cos\alpha)\cos\theta-(a_2\sin\alpha+a_1\sin\alpha)\sin\theta}{\cos^2\alpha\ \cos^2\theta-\sin^2\alpha\ \sin^2\theta}.
\end{align}$$
Combining constants gives
$$r=\frac{b\cos\theta+c\sin\theta}{\cos^2\theta-m^2\sin^2\theta}$$
which in Cartesian coordinates is
$$x^2-m^2y^2=bx+cy.$$
This is a hyperbola passing through the origin. So the cissoid of two non-parallel lines is a hyperbola containing the pole. A similar derivation show that, conversely, any hyperbola is the cissoid of two non-parallel lines relative to any point on it.

=== Cissoids of Zahradnik ===
A cissoid of Zahradnik (named after Karel Zahradnik) is defined as the cissoid of a conic section and a line relative to any point on the conic. This is a broad family of rational cubic curves containing several well-known examples. Specifically:

- The Trisectrix of Maclaurin given by
  $$2x(x^2+y^2)=a(3x^2-y^2)$$
  is the cissoid of the circle $(x+a)^2+y^2 = a^2$ and the line $x=-\tfrac{a}{2}$ relative to the origin.
- The right strophoid
  $$y^2(a+x) = x^2(a-x)$$
  is the cissoid of the circle $(x+a)^2+y^2 = a^2$ and the line $x=-a$ relative to the origin.

Animation visualizing the Cissoid of Diocles

- The cissoid of Diocles
  $$x(x^2+y^2)+2ay^2=0$$
  is the cissoid of the circle $(x+a)^2+y^2 = a^2$ and the line $x=-2a$ relative to the origin. This is, in fact, the curve for which the family is named and some authors refer to this as simply as cissoid.
- The cissoid of the circle $(x+a)^2+y^2 = a^2$ and the line $x=ka,$ where k is a parameter, is called a Conchoid of de Sluze. (These curves are not actually conchoids.) This family includes the previous examples.
- The folium of Descartes
  $$x^3+y^3=3axy$$
  is the cissoid of the ellipse $x^2-xy+y^2 = -a(x+y)$ and the line $x+y=-a$ relative to the origin. To see this, note that the line can be written
  $$x=-\frac{a}{1+p},\ y=px$$
  and the ellipse can be written
  $$x=-\frac{a(1+p)}{1-p+p^2},\ y=px.$$
  So the cissoid is given by
  $$x=-\frac{a}{1+p}+\frac{a(1+p)}{1-p+p^2} = \frac{3ap}{1+p^3},\ y=px$$
  which is a parametric form of the folium.

== See also ==
- Conchoid
- Strophoid
