= Elkies trinomial curves =

Certain hyperelliptic curves constructed by Noam Elkies

Elkies trinomial curve C_{168}

In number theory, the Elkies trinomial curves are certain hyperelliptic curves constructed by Noam Elkies which have the property that rational points on them correspond to trinomial polynomials giving an extension of Q with particular Galois groups.

One curve, C_{168}, gives Galois group PSL(2,7) from a polynomial of degree seven, and the other, C_{1344}, gives Galois group AL(8), the semidirect product of a 2-elementary group of order eight acted on by PSL(2, 7), giving a transitive permutation subgroup of the symmetric group on eight roots of order 1344.

The equation of the curve C_{168} is

$$y^2 = x(81x^5+396x^4+738x^3+660x^2+269x+48).$$

The curve is a plane algebraic curve model for a Galois resolvent for the trinomial polynomial equation x^{7} + bx + c = 0. If there exists a point (x, y) on the (projectivized) curve, there is a corresponding pair (b, c) of rational numbers, such that the trinomial either factors or has Galois group PSL(2,7), the finite simple group of order 168. The curve has genus two, so by Faltings' theorem there are only a finite number of rational points on it. These rational points were proved by Nils Bruin using the computer program Kash to be the only ones on C_{168}, and they give only four distinct trinomials with Galois group PSL(2,7): x^{7} − 7x + 3 (the Trinks polynomial), x^{7}/11 − 14x + 3^{2} (the Erbach-Fisher-McKay polynomial), and two new polynomials with Galois group PSL(2,7),

$$37^2x^7-28x+3^2$$

and

$$\frac{499^2}{113}x^7-212x+3^4$$.

On the other hand, the equation of curve C_{1344} is

$$y^2 = 2 x^6 + 4 x^5 + 36 x^4 + 16 x^3 - 45 x^2 + 190 x + 1241.$$

Once again the genus is two, and by Faltings' theorem the list of rational points is finite. It is thought the only rational points on it correspond to polynomials x^{8} + 16x + 28, x^{8} + 576x + 1008, 19^{4}53x^{8} + 19x + 2 which have Galois group AL(8), and x^{8} + 324x + 567, which comes from two different rational points and has Galois group PSL(2,7) again, this time as the Galois group of a polynomial of degree eight.
