= Trisectrix of Maclaurin =

Cubic plane curve

Maclaurin's trisectrix as the locus of the intersection of two rotating lines

In algebraic geometry, the trisectrix of Maclaurin is a cubic plane curve notable for its trisectrix property, meaning it can be used to trisect an angle. It can be defined as locus of the point of intersection of two lines, each rotating at a uniform rate about separate points, so that the ratio of the rates of rotation is 1:3 and the lines initially coincide with the line between the two points. A generalization of this construction is called a sectrix of Maclaurin. The curve is named after Colin Maclaurin who investigated the curve in 1742.

== Equations ==
Let two lines rotate about the points $P = (0,0)$ and $P_1 = (a, 0)$ so that when the line rotating about $P$ has angle $\theta$ with the x axis, the rotating about $P_1$ has angle $3\theta$. Let $Q$ be the point of intersection, then the angle formed by the lines at $Q$ is $2\theta$. By the law of sines,

$${r \over \sin 3\theta} = {a \over \sin 2\theta}\!$$

so the equation in polar coordinates is (up to translation and rotation)

$$r= a \frac{\sin 3\theta}{\sin 2\theta} = {a \over 2} \frac{4 \cos^2 \theta - 1} {\cos \theta} = {a \over 2} (4 \cos \theta - \sec \theta).\!$$

The curve is therefore a member of the conchoid of de Sluze family.

In Cartesian coordinates the equation of this curve is

$$2x(x^2+y^2)=a(3x^2-y^2).\!$$

Solving for x, we get

$x=\frac{\frac{1}{2}a(3x^2-y^2) }{x^2+y^2}$

Solving for y, we get

$y=\sqrt{\frac{a(3x^2-y^2) }{2x}-x^2}$

If the origin is moved to (a, 0) then a derivation similar to that given above shows that the equation of the curve in polar coordinates becomes

$$r = 2a \cos{\theta \over 3},\!$$

making it an example of a limacon with a loop.

== The trisection property ==
The trisectrix of Maclaurin showing the angle trisection property

Given an angle $\phi$, draw a ray from $(a, 0)$ whose angle with the $x$-axis is $\phi$. Draw a ray from the origin to the point where the first ray intersects the curve. Then, by the construction of the curve, the angle between the second ray and the $x$-axis is $\phi/ 3$.

== Notable points and features ==
The curve has an x-intercept at $3a \over 2$ and a double point at the origin. The vertical line $x={-{a \over 2}}$ is an asymptote. The curve intersects the line x = a, or the point corresponding to the trisection of a right angle, at $(a,{\pm {1 \over \sqrt{3}} a})$. As a nodal cubic, it is of genus zero.

== Relationship to other curves ==
The trisectrix of Maclaurin can be defined from conic sections in three ways. Specifically:

- It is the inverse with respect to the unit circle of the hyperbola

$$2x=a(3x^2-y^2).$$

- It is cissoid of the circle

$$(x+a)^2+y^2 = a^2$$

and the line $x={a \over 2}$ relative to the origin.

- It is the pedal with respect to the origin of the parabola

$$y^2=2a(x-\tfrac{3}{2}a).$$

In addition:

- The inverse with respect to the point $(a, 0)$ is the Limaçon trisectrix.
- The trisectrix of Maclaurin is related to the folium of Descartes by affine transformation.
