= Karel Zahradnik =

Czech mathematician (1848–1916)

Karel Zahradnik (1848–1916) was a mathematician at the University of Zagreb. In his 23 years of productive activity in Zagreb he wrote several significant scholarly works, mainly concerned with algebraic curves.

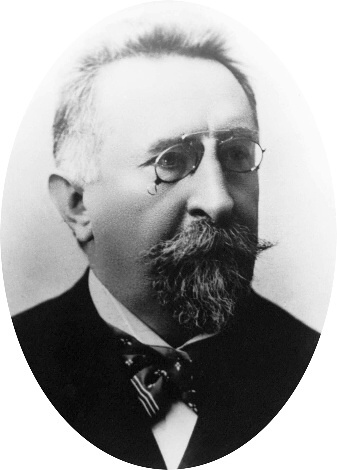
Karel Zahradník
