= Strophoid =

Geometric curve constructed from another curve and two points

Construction of a strophoid. Given curve C Variable line L which rotates about the pole O; intersects C at point K Circle centered at K whose size is constrained by the fixed point A; intersects L at P_{1} and P_{2} Inner portion of the strophoid curve, traced by P_{1} as L rotates Outer portion of the strophoid curve, traced by P_{2} as L rotates

In geometry, a strophoid is a curve generated from a given curve C and points A (the fixed point) and O (the pole) as follows: Let L be a variable line passing through O and intersecting C at K. Now let P_{1} and P_{2} be the two points on L whose distance from K is the same as the distance from A to K (i.e. K̅P̅_{1} = K̅P̅_{2} = A̅K̅). The locus of such points P_{1} and P_{2} is then the strophoid of C with respect to the pole O and fixed point A. Note that A̅P̅_{1} and A̅P̅_{2} are at right angles in this construction.

In the special case where C is a line, A lies on C, and O is not on C, then the curve is called an oblique strophoid. If, in addition, O̅A̅ is perpendicular to C then the curve is called a right strophoid, or simply strophoid by some authors. The right strophoid is also called the logocyclic curve or foliate.

== Equations ==
=== Polar coordinates ===
Let the curve C be given by $r = f(\theta),$ where the origin is taken to be O. Let A be the point (a, b). If $K = (r \cos\theta,\ r \sin\theta)$ is a point on the curve the distance from K to A is

$$d = \sqrt{(r \cos\theta - a)^2 + (r \sin\theta - b)^2} = \sqrt{(f(\theta) \cos\theta - a)^2 + (f(\theta) \sin\theta - b)^2}.$$

The points on the line O̅K̅ have polar angle θ, and the points at distance d from K on this line are distance $f(\theta) \pm d$ from the origin. Therefore, the equation of the strophoid is given by

$$r = f(\theta) \pm \sqrt{(f(\theta) \cos\theta - a)^2 + (f(\theta) \sin\theta - b)^2}$$

=== Cartesian coordinates ===
Let C be given parametrically by (x(t), y(t)). Let A be the point (a, b) and let O be the point (p, q). Then, by a straightforward application of the polar formula, the strophoid is given parametrically by:

$$u(t) = p + (x(t)-p)(1 \pm n(t)),\ v(t) = q + (y(t)-q)(1 \pm n(t)),$$

where

$$n(t) = \sqrt{\frac{(x(t)-a)^2+(y(t)-b)^2}{(x(t)-p)^2+(y(t)-q)^2}}.$$

=== An alternative polar formula ===
The complex nature of the formulas given above limits their usefulness in specific cases. There is an alternative form which is sometimes simpler to apply. This is particularly useful when C is a sectrix of Maclaurin with poles O and A.

Let O be the origin and A be the point (a, 0). Let K be a point on the curve, θ the angle between O̅K̅ and the x-axis, and $\vartheta$ the angle between A̅K̅ and the x-axis. Suppose $\vartheta$ can be given as a function θ, say $\vartheta = l(\theta).$ Let ψ be the angle at K so $\psi = \vartheta - \theta.$ We can determine r in terms of l using the law of sines. Since

$${r \over \sin \vartheta} = {a \over \sin \psi},\ r = a \frac {\sin \vartheta}{\sin \psi} = a \frac {\sin l(\theta)}{\sin (l(\theta) - \theta)}.$$

Let P_{1} and P_{2} be the points on O̅K̅ that are distance A̅K̅ from K, numbering so that $\psi = \angle P_1KA$ and $\pi-\psi = \angle AKP_2.$ △P_{1}KA is isosceles with vertex angle ψ, so the remaining angles, $\angle AP_1K$ and $\angle KAP_1,$ are $\tfrac{\pi-\psi}{2}.$ The angle between A̅P̅_{1} and the x-axis is then

$$l_1(\theta) = \vartheta + \angle KAP_1 = \vartheta + (\pi-\psi)/2 = \vartheta + (\pi - \vartheta + \theta)/2 = (\vartheta+\theta+\pi)/2.$$

By a similar argument, or simply using the fact that A̅P̅_{1} and A̅P̅_{2} are at right angles, the angle between A̅P̅_{2} and the x-axis is then

$$l_2(\theta) = (\vartheta+\theta)/2.$$

The polar equation for the strophoid can now be derived from l_{1} and l_{2} from the formula above:

$$\begin{align}
& r_1=a \frac {\sin l_1(\theta)}{\sin (l_1(\theta) - \theta)} = a \frac {\sin ((l(\theta)+\theta+\pi)/2)}{\sin ((l(\theta)+\theta+\pi)/2 - \theta)} = a \frac{\cos ((l(\theta)+\theta)/2)}{\cos ((l(\theta)-\theta)/2)} \\
& r_2=a \frac {\sin l_2(\theta)}{\sin (l_2(\theta) - \theta)} = a \frac {\sin ((l(\theta)+\theta)/2)}{\sin ((l(\theta)+\theta)/2 - \theta)} = a \frac{\sin((l(\theta)+\theta)/2)}{\sin((l(\theta)-\theta)/2)}
\end{align}$$

C is a sectrix of Maclaurin with poles O and A when l is of the form $q \theta + \theta_0,$ in that case l_{1} and l_{2} will have the same form so the strophoid is either another sectrix of Maclaurin or a pair of such curves. In this case there is also a simple polar equation for the polar equation if the origin is shifted to the right by a.

== Specific cases ==
Strophoids of lines are actually expressible as singular cubics in the projective plane.

=== Oblique strophoids ===
Let C be a line through A. Then, in the notation used above, $l(\theta) = \alpha$ where α is a constant. Then $l_1(\theta) = (\theta + \alpha + \pi)/2$ and $l_2(\theta) = (\theta + \alpha)/2.$ The polar equations of the resulting strophoid, called an oblique strphoid, with the origin at O are then

$$r = a \frac{\cos ((\alpha+\theta)/2)}{\cos ((\alpha-\theta)/2)}$$

and

$$r = a \frac{\sin ((\alpha+\theta)/2)}{\sin ((\alpha-\theta)/2)}.$$

It's easy to check that these equations describe the same curve.

Moving the origin to A (again, see Sectrix of Maclaurin) and replacing −a with a produces

$$r=a\frac{\sin(2\theta-\alpha)}{\sin(\theta-\alpha)},$$

and rotating by $\alpha$ in turn produces

$$r=a\frac{\sin(2\theta+\alpha)}{\sin(\theta)}.$$

In rectangular coordinates, with a change of constant parameters, this is

$$y(x^2+y^2)=b(x^2-y^2)+2cxy.$$

This is a cubic curve and, by the expression in polar coordinates it is rational. It has a crunode at (0, 0) and the line y = b is an asymptote.

=== The right strophoid ===
A right strophoid

Putting $\alpha = \pi/2$ in

$$r=a\frac{\sin(2\theta-\alpha)}{\sin(\theta-\alpha)}$$

gives

$$r=a\frac{\cos 2\theta}{\cos \theta} = a(2\cos\theta-\sec\theta).$$

This is called the right strophoid and corresponds to the case where C is the y-axis, A is the origin, and O is the point (a, 0).

The Cartesian equation is

$$y^2 = x^2(a-x)/(a+x).$$

The curve resembles the Folium of Descartes and the line x = –a is an asymptote to two branches. The curve has two more asymptotes, in the plane with complex coordinates, given by

$$x\pm iy = -a.$$

This curve passes through the two circular points at infinity and is a special case of a focal circular Van Rees cubic.

=== Circles ===
Let C be a circle through O and A, where O is the origin and A is the point (a, 0). Then, in the notation used above, $l(\theta) = \alpha+\theta$ where $\alpha$ is a constant. Then $l_1(\theta) = \theta + (\alpha + \pi)/2$ and $l_2(\theta) = \theta + \alpha/2.$ The polar equations of the resulting strophoid, called an oblique strophoid, with the origin at O are then

$$r = a \frac{\cos (\theta+\alpha/2)}{\cos (\alpha/2)}$$

and

$$r = a \frac{\sin (\theta+\alpha/2)}{\sin (\alpha/2)}.$$

These are the equations of the two circles which also pass through O and A and form angles of $\pi/4$ with C at these points.

== See also ==
- Conchoid
- Cissoid
