= Conchoid of de Sluze =

Family of algebraic curves of the form r = sec(θ) + a*cos(θ)

The Conchoid of de Sluze for several values of a

In algebraic geometry, the conchoids of de Sluze are a family of plane curves studied in 1662 by Walloon mathematician René François Walter, baron de Sluze.

The curves are defined by the polar equation

$$r=\sec\theta+a\cos\theta \,.$$

In cartesian coordinates, the curves satisfy the implicit equation

$$(x-1)(x^2+y^2)=ax^2 \,$$

except that for a = 0 the implicit form has an acnode (0,0) not present in polar form.

They are rational, circular, cubic plane curves.

These expressions have an asymptote x = 1 (for a ≠ 0). The point most distant from the asymptote is (1 + a, 0). (0,0) is a crunode for a < −1.

The area between the curve and the asymptote is, for a ≥ −1,

$$|a|(1+a/4)\pi \,$$

while for a < −1, the area is

$$\left(1-\frac a2\right)\sqrt{-(a+1)}-a\left(2+\frac a2\right)\arcsin\frac1{\sqrt{-a}}.$$

If a < −1, the curve will have a loop. The area of the loop is

$$\left(2+\frac a2\right)a\arccos\frac1{\sqrt{-a}} + \left(1-\frac a2\right)\sqrt{-(a+1)}.$$

Four of the family have names of their own:

- a = 0, line (asymptote to the rest of the family)
- a = −1, cissoid of Diocles
- a = −2, right strophoid
- a = −4, trisectrix of Maclaurin
