= Cissoid of Diocles =

Cubic plane curve

Cissoid of Diocles traced by points M with $\overline{OM} = \overline{M_1M_2}$

Animation visualizing the Cissoid of Diocles

In geometry, the cissoid of Diocles (from Ancient Greek κισσοειδής (kissoeidēs) 'ivy-shaped'; named for Diocles) is a cubic plane curve notable for the property that it can be used to construct two mean proportionals to a given ratio. In particular, it can be used to double a cube. It can be defined as the cissoid of a circle and a line tangent to it with respect to the point on the circle opposite to the point of tangency. In fact, the curve family of cissoids is named for this example and some authors refer to it simply as the cissoid. It has a single cusp at the pole, and is symmetric about the diameter of the circle which is the line of tangency of the cusp. The line is an asymptote. It is a member of the conchoid of de Sluze family of curves. In its overall form (having both a cusp and an asymptotic line perpendicular to its axis of symmetry) it resembles a tractrix, but it differs from the tractrix in having a polynomial equation.

== Construction and equations ==
Let the radius of C be a. By translation and rotation, we may take O to be the origin and the center of the circle to be (a, 0), so A is (2a, 0). Then the polar equations of L and C are:

$$\begin{align}
& r=2a\sec\theta \\
& r=2a\cos\theta .
\end{align}$$

By construction, the distance from the origin to a point on the cissoid is equal to the difference between the distances between the origin and the corresponding points on L and C. In other words, the polar equation of the cissoid is

$$r=2a\sec\theta-2a\cos\theta=2a(\sec\theta-\cos\theta).$$

Applying some trigonometric identities, this is equivalent to

$$r=2a\sin^2\!\theta\mathbin/\cos\theta=2a\sin\theta\tan\theta .$$

Let t = tan θ in the above equation. Then

$$\begin{align}
& x = r\cos\theta = 2a\sin^2\!\theta = \frac{2a\tan^2\!\theta}{\sec^2\!\theta} = \frac{2at^2}{1+t^2} \\
& y = tx = \frac{2at^3}{1+t^2}
\end{align}$$

are parametric equations for the cissoid.

Converting the polar form to Cartesian coordinates produces

$$(x^2+y^2)x=2ay^2$$

=== Construction by double projection ===
Mechanism to generate the cissoid

A compass-and-straightedge construction of various points on the cissoid proceeds as follows. Given a line L and a point O not on L, construct the line L' through O parallel to L. Choose a variable point P on L, and construct Q, the orthogonal projection of P on L', then R, the orthogonal projection of Q on OP. Then the cissoid is the locus of points R.

To see this, let O be the origin and L the line x = 2a as above. Let P be the point (2a, 2at); then Q is (0, 2at) and the equation of the line OP is y = tx. The line through Q perpendicular to OP is

$$t(y-2at)+x=0.$$

To find the point of intersection R, set y = tx in this equation to get

$$\begin{align}
& t(tx-2at)+x=0,\ x(t^2+1)=2at^2,\ x=\frac{2at^2}{t^2+1} \\
& y=tx=\frac{2at^3}{t^2+1}
\end{align}$$

which are the parametric equations given above.

While this construction produces arbitrarily many points on the cissoid, it cannot trace any continuous segment of the curve.

=== Newton's construction ===
Newton's construction

The following construction was given by Isaac Newton. Let J be a line and B a point not on J. Let ∠BST be a right angle which moves so that S̅T̅ equals the distance from B to J and T remains on J, while the other leg B̅S̅ slides along B. Then the midpoint P of S̅T̅ describes the curve.

To see this, let the distance between B and J be 2a. By translation and rotation, take B = (–a, 0) and J the line x = a. Let P = (x, y) and let ψ be the angle between S̅B̅ and the x-axis; this is equal to the angle between S̅T̅ and J. By construction, P̅T̅ = a, so the distance from P to J is a sin ψ. In other words a – x = a sin ψ. Also, S̅P̅ = a is the y-coordinate of (x, y) if it is rotated by angle ψ, so a = (x + a) sin ψ + y cos ψ. After simplification, this produces parametric equations

$$x=a(1-\sin\psi),\,y=a\frac{(1-\sin\psi)^2}{\cos\psi}.$$

Change parameters by replacing ψ with its complement to get

$$x=a(1-\cos\psi),\,y=a\frac{(1-\cos\psi)^2}{\sin\psi}$$

or, applying double angle formulas,

$$x=2a\sin^2{\psi \over 2},\,y=a\frac{4\sin^4{\psi \over 2}}{2\sin{\psi \over 2}\cos{\psi \over 2}} = 2a\frac{\sin^3{\psi \over 2}}{\cos{\psi \over 2}}.$$

But this is polar equation

$$r=2a\frac{\sin^2\theta}{\cos\theta}$$

given above with θ = ψ/2.

Note that, as with the double projection construction, this can be adapted to produce a mechanical device that generates the curve.

== Delian problem ==
The Greek geometer Diocles used the cissoid to obtain two mean proportionals to a given ratio. This means that given lengths a and b, the curve can be used to find u and v so that a is to u as u is to v as v is to b, i.e. a/u = u/v = v/b, as discovered by Hippocrates of Chios. As a special case, this can be used to solve the Delian problem: how much must the length of a cube be increased in order to double its volume? Specifically, if a is the side of a cube, and b = 2a, then the volume of a cube of side u is

$$u^3=a^3\left(\frac{u}{a}\right)^3=a^3\left(\frac{u}{a}\right)\left(\frac{v}{u}\right)\left(\frac{b}{v}\right)=a^3\left(\frac{b}{a}\right)=2a^3$$

so u is the side of a cube with double the volume of the original cube. Note however that this solution does not fall within the rules of compass and straightedge construction since it relies on the existence of the cissoid.

Let a and b be given. It is required to find u so that u^{3} = a^{2}b, giving u and v = u^{2}/a as the mean proportionals. Let the cissoid

$$(x^2+y^2)x=2ay^2$$

be constructed as above, with O the origin, A the point (2a, 0), and J the line x = a, also as given above. Let C be the point of intersection of J with OA. From the given length b, mark B on J so that C̅B̅ = b. Draw BA and let P = (x, y) be the point where it intersects the cissoid. Draw OP and let it intersect J at U. Then u = C̅U̅ is the required length.

To see this, rewrite the equation of the curve as

$$y^2=\frac{x^3}{2a-x}$$

and let N = (x, 0), so P̅N̅ is the perpendicular to OA through P. From the equation of the curve,

$$\overline{PN}^2=\frac{\overline{ON}^3}{\overline{NA}}.$$

From this,

$$\frac{\overline{PN}^3}{\overline{ON}^3}=\frac{\overline{PN}}{\overline{NA}}.$$

By similar triangles P̅N̅/O̅N̅ = U̅C̅/O̅C̅ and P̅N̅/N̅A̅ = B̅C̅/C̅A̅. So the equation becomes

$$\frac{\overline{UC}^3}{\overline{OC}^3}=\frac{\overline{BC}}{\overline{CA}},$$

so

$$\frac{u^3}{a^3}=\frac{b}{a},\, u^3=a^2b$$

as required.

Animation of Diocles' point-wise construction of the cissoid, using 500 randomly selected points.

Diocles did not really solve the Delian problem. The reason is that the cissoid of Diocles cannot be constructed perfectly, at least not with compass and straightedge. To construct the cissoid of Diocles, one would construct a finite number of its individual points, then connect all these points to form a curve. (An example of this construction is shown on the right.) The problem is that there is no well-defined way to connect the points. If they are connected by line segments, then the construction will be well-defined, but it will not be an exact cissoid of Diocles, but only an approximation. Likewise, if the dots are connected with circular arcs, the construction will be well-defined, but incorrect. Or one could simply draw a curve directly, trying to eyeball the shape of the curve, but the result would only be imprecise guesswork.

Once the finite set of points on the cissoid have been drawn, then line PC will probably not intersect one of these points exactly, but will pass between them, intersecting the cissoid of Diocles at some point whose exact location has not been constructed, but has only been approximated. An alternative is to keep adding constructed points to the cissoid which get closer and closer to the intersection with line PC, but the number of steps may very well be infinite, and the Greeks did not recognize approximations as limits of infinite steps (so they were very puzzled by Zeno's paradoxes).

One could also construct a cissoid of Diocles by means of a mechanical tool specially designed for that purpose, but this violates the rule of only using compass and straightedge. This rule was established for reasons of logical — axiomatic — consistency. Allowing construction by new tools would be like adding new axioms, but axioms are supposed to be simple and self-evident, but such tools are not. So by the rules of classical, synthetic geometry, Diocles did not solve the Delian problem, which actually can not be solved by such means.

== As a pedal curve ==
A pair of parabolas face each other symmetrically: one on top and one on the bottom. Then the top parabola is rolled without slipping along the bottom one, and its successive positions are shown in the animation. Then the path traced by the vertex of the top parabola as it rolls is a roulette shown in red, which is the cissoid of Diocles.

The pedal curve of a parabola with respect to its vertex is a cissoid of Diocles. The geometrical properties of pedal curves in general produce several alternate methods of constructing the cissoid. It is the envelopes of circles whose centers lie on a parabola and which pass through the vertex of the parabola. Also, if two congruent parabolas are set vertex-to-vertex and one is rolled along the other; the vertex of the rolling parabola will trace the cissoid.

== Inversion ==
The cissoid of Diocles can also be defined as the inverse curve of a parabola with the center of inversion at the vertex. To see this, take the parabola to be x = y^{2}, in polar coordinate $r\cos\theta = (r\sin \theta)^2$ or:

$$r=\frac{\cos\theta}{\sin^2\!\theta}\,.$$

The inverse curve is thus:

$$r=\frac{\sin^2\!\theta}{\cos\theta} = \sin\theta \tan\theta,$$

which agrees with the polar equation of the cissoid above.
