= Folium of Descartes =

Algebraic curve

The folium of Descartes (green) with asymptote (blue), when a = 1

In geometry, the folium of Descartes (from Latin folium 'leaf') is an algebraic curve defined by the implicit equation $x^3 + y^3 - 3ayx = 0$. It is named after the mathematician and philosopher René Descartes.

== History ==
The curve was first proposed and studied in 1638 by René Descartes, who was interested in classifying curves by the degrees of their algebraic equations. Its claim to fame lies in an incident in the development of calculus. Descartes challenged Pierre de Fermat to find the tangent line to the curve at an arbitrary point, since Fermat had recently discovered a method for finding tangent lines. Fermat solved the problem easily, something Descartes was unable to do. Since the invention of calculus, the slope of the tangent line can be found easily using implicit differentiation.

== Graphing the curve ==
The folium of Descartes can be expressed in polar coordinates as
$$r = \frac{3 a \sin \theta \cos \theta}{\sin^3 \theta + \cos^3 \theta }.$$
This is equivalent to
$$r = \frac{3a \sec\theta \tan\theta}{1 + \tan^3 \theta}.$$

Another technique is to write $y = px$ and solve for $x$ and $y$ in terms of $p$. This yields the rational parametric equations:
$$x = {{3ap} \over {1 + p^3}},\, y = {{3ap^2} \over {1 + p^3}}.$$

We can see that the parameter is related to the position on the curve as follows:

- $p < -1$ corresponds to $x>0$, $y<0$: the right, lower, "wing".
- $-1 < p < 0$ corresponds to $x<0$, $y>0$: the left, upper "wing".
- $p>0$ corresponds to $x>0$, $y>0$: the loop of the curve.

Another way of plotting the function can be derived from symmetry over $y = x$. The symmetry can be seen directly from its equation ($x$ and $y$ can be interchanged). By applying rotation of 45° clockwise for example, one can plot the function symmetric over rotated $x$-axis.

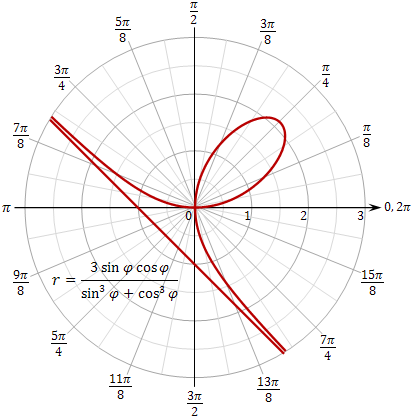
Folium of Descartes in polar coordinates r, φ: r(φ)/a, a = 1

This operation is equivalent to a substitution:

$$x = {{u+v} \over {\sqrt{2}}},\, y = {{u-v} \over {\sqrt{2}}}$$
and yields
$$v=\pm u\sqrt{\frac{3a\sqrt{2}-2u}{6u+3a\sqrt{2}}}\,,\,u<3a/\sqrt{2}.$$
Plotting in the Cartesian system of $(u,v)$ gives the folium rotated by 45° and therefore symmetric by $u$-axis.

== Properties ==
It forms a loop in the first quadrant with a double point at the origin and has asymptote
$$x+y=-a \,.$$
It is symmetrical about the line $y = x$. As such, the curve and this line intersect at the origin and at the point $(3a/2,3a/2).$

Implicit differentiation gives the formula for the slope of the tangent line to this curve to be
$$\frac{dy}{dx}=\frac{ay-x^2}{y^2-ax}\,,$$
with poles $x=y^2/a$ and value $0$ or $\pm \infty$ at the origin.

Using either one of the polar representations above, the area of the interior of the loop is found to be $\textstyle 3a^2 / 2$. Moreover, the area between the "wings" of the curve and its slanted asymptote is also $\textstyle 3a^2/2$.

== Relationship to the trisectrix of Maclaurin ==
Trisectrix of Maclaurin

The folium of Descartes is related to the trisectrix of Maclaurin by affine transformation. To see this, start with the equation
$$x^3+y^3=3a\cdot xy\,,$$
and change variables to find the equation in a coordinate system rotated 45 degrees. This amounts to setting
$$x = {{X+Y} \over \sqrt{2}}, y = {{X-Y} \over \sqrt{2}}.$$

In the $X,Y$ plane the equation is
$$2X(X^2 + 3Y^2) = 3 \sqrt{2}a(X^2-Y^2).$$

If we stretch the curve in the $Y$ direction by a factor of $\sqrt{3}$ this becomes
$$2X(X^2 + Y^2) = a \sqrt{2}(3X^2-Y^2),$$
which is the equation of the trisectrix of Maclaurin.
