= List of curves =

This is a list of Wikipedia articles about curves used in different fields: mathematics (including geometry, statistics, and applied mathematics), physics, engineering, economics, medicine, biology, psychology, ecology, etc.

== Mathematics (Geometry) ==
=== Algebraic curves ===
==== Rational curves ====
Rational curves are subdivided according to the degree of the polynomial.

===== Degree 1 =====
- Line

===== Degree 2 =====
Plane curves of degree 2 are known as conics or conic sections and include

- Circle
  - Unit circle
- Ellipse
- Parabola
- Hyperbola
  - Unit hyperbola

===== Degree 3 =====
Cubic plane curves include

- Cubic parabola
- Folium of Descartes
- Cissoid of Diocles
- Conchoid of de Sluze
- Right strophoid
- Semicubical parabola
- Serpentine curve
- Trident curve
- Trisectrix of Maclaurin
- Tschirnhausen cubic
- Witch of Agnesi

===== Degree 4 =====
Quartic plane curves include

- Ampersand curve
- Bean curve
- Bicorn
- Bow curve
- Bullet-nose curve
- Cartesian oval
- Conchoid of Dürer
- Cruciform curve
- Deltoid curve
- Devil's curve
- Hippopede
- Kampyle of Eudoxus
- Kappa curve
- Lemniscate
  - Lemniscate of Booth
  - Lemniscate of Gerono
  - Lemniscate of Bernoulli
- Limaçon
  - Cardioid
  - Limaçon trisectrix
- Ovals of Cassini
- Squircle
- Three-leaved clover

===== Degree 6 =====
- Astroid
- Atriphtaloid
- Nephroid
- Quadrifolium

===== Curve families of variable degree =====
- Epicycloid
- Epispiral
- Epitrochoid
- Hypocycloid
- Hypotrochoid
- Lissajous curve
- Poinsot's spirals
- Rational normal curve
- Rose curve

==== Curves with genus 1 ====
- Bicuspid curve
- Cassinoide
- Cubic curve
- Elliptic curve
- Watt's curve

==== Curves with genus > 1 ====
- Bolza surface (genus 2)
- Klein quartic (genus 3)
- Bring's curve (genus 4)
- Macbeath surface (genus 7)
- Butterfly curve (algebraic) (genus 7)

==== Curve families with variable genus ====
- Polynomial lemniscate
- Fermat curve
- Sinusoidal spiral
- Superellipse
- Hurwitz surface
- Elkies trinomial curves
- Hyperelliptic curve
- Classical modular curve
- Cassini oval

=== Transcendental curves ===
- Bowditch curve
- Brachistochrone
- Butterfly curve (transcendental)
- Catenary
- Clélies
- Cochleoid
- Cycloid
- Horopter
- Isochrone
  - Isochrone of Huygens (Tautochrone)
  - Isochrone of Leibniz
  - Isochrone of Varignon
- Lamé curve
- Pursuit curve
- Rhumb line
- Sinusoid
- Spirals
  - Archimedean spiral
  - Cornu spiral
  - Cotes' spiral
  - Fermat's spiral
  - Galileo's spiral
  - Hyperbolic spiral
  - Lituus
  - Logarithmic spiral
  - Nielsen's spiral
- Syntractrix
- Tractrix
- Trochoid

=== Piecewise constructions ===
- Bézier curve
- Loess curve
- Lowess
- Ogee
- Polygonal curve
  - Maurer rose
- Reuleaux triangle
- Stadium
- Splines
  - B-spline
  - Nonuniform rational B-spline

=== Fractal curves ===
- Blancmange curve
- De Rham curve
- Dragon curve
- Koch curve
- Lévy C curve
- Sierpiński curve
- Space-filling curve (Peano curve)

See also List of fractals by Hausdorff dimension.

=== Space curves/Skew curves ===
- Conchospiral
- Helix
  - Hemihelix, a quasi-helical shape characterized by multiple tendril perversions
  - Tendril perversion (a transition between back-to-back helices)
- Seiffert's spiral
- Slinky spiral
- Space cardioid
- Twisted cubic
- Viviani's curve

=== Curves generated by other curves ===
- Caustic including Catacaustic and Diacaustic
- Cissoid
- Conchoid
- Evolute
- Glissette
- Inverse curve
- Involute
- Isoptic including Orthoptic
- Negative pedal curve
  - Fish curve
- Orthotomic
- Parallel curve
- Pedal curve
- Radial curve
- Roulette
- Strophoid

== Applied Mathematics/Statistics/Physics/Engineering ==
- Bathtub curve
- Bell curve
- Calibration curve
- Curve of growth (astronomy)
- Fletcher–Munson curve
- Galaxy rotation curve
- Gompertz curve
- Growth curve (statistics)
- Kruithof curve
- Light curve
- Logistic curve
- Paschen curve
- Robinson–Dadson curves
- Stress–strain curve
- Space-filling curve

== Economics/Business ==
- Contract curve
- Cost curve
- Demand curve
  - Aggregate demand curve
  - Compensated demand curve
- Duck curve
- Engel curve
- Hubbert curve
- Indifference curve
- J curve
- Kuznets curve
- Laffer curve
- Lorenz curve
- Phillips curve
- Supply curve
  - Aggregate supply curve
  - Backward bending supply curve of labor

== Medicine/Biology ==
- Cardiac function curve
- Dose–response curve
- Growth curve (biology)
- Oxygen–hemoglobin dissociation curve

== Psychology ==
- Forgetting curve
- Learning curve

== Ecology ==
- Species–area curve

== See also ==
- Gallery of curves
- List of curves topics
- List of spirals
- List of surfaces
- Riemann surface
- Spherical curve
