= Glossary of shapes with metaphorical names =

Gaussian curve with a two-dimensional domain

Many shapes have metaphorical names, i.e., their names are metaphors: these shapes are named after a most common object that has it. For example, "U-shape" is a shape that resembles the letter U, a bell-shaped curve has the shape of the vertical cross section of a bell, etc. These terms may variously refer to objects, their cross sections or projections.

== Types of shapes ==
Curves
The Fish bladder is the intersection of two congruent disks, each centered on the perimeter of the other

Bicorn

Astroid

Tomahawk curve, with its handle and spike thickened

Some of these names are "classical terms", i.e., words of Latin or Ancient Greek etymology. Others are English language constructs (although the base words may have non-English etymology). In some disciplines, where shapes of subjects in question are a very important consideration, the shape naming may be quite elaborate, see, e.g., the taxonomy of shapes of plant leaves in botany.

- Ampersand curve
- Arbelos, from Greek árbylos, meaning "shoemaker's knife"
- Astroid
- Aquiline, shaped like an eagle's beak (as in a Roman nose)
- Bathtub curve
- Basket-handle arch
- Bell-shaped curve
- Biconic shape, a shape in a way opposite to the hourglass: it is based on two oppositely oriented cones or truncated cones with their bases joined; the cones are not necessarily the same
  - Bowtie shape, in two dimensions
  - Atmospheric reentry apparatus
  - Centerbody of an inlet cone in ramjets
- Bow shape
  - Bow curve
- Bullet Nose an open-ended hourglass
- Butterfly
  - Butterfly curve (algebraic)
  - Butterfly curve (transcendental)
  - Butterfly lemma
  - Butterfly graph
- Catenary, derived from the Latin word catēna, which means "chain".
- Cissoid (from Ancient Greek κισσοειδής (kissoeidēs) 'ivy-shaped')
- Cocked hat curve, also known as Bicorn
- Cone (from the Greek word for « pine cone »)
- Doughnut shape
- Dragon curve
- Egg-shaped, see "Oval", below
  - Superegg
  - Moss's Egg
- Elephant
  - Elephant curve
  - Von Neumann's elephant
- Fish curve
- Geoid (From Greek Ge (γη) for "Earth"), the term specifically introduced to denote the approximation of the shape of the Earth, which is approximately spherical, but not exactly so
- Heart shape, long been used for its varied symbolism
  - Cardioid
- Hedgehog
  - Hedgehog (geometry)
  - Hedgehog space
- Horseshoe-shaped or hippocrepiform, resembling a horseshoe, cf. horseshoe (disambiguation). In botany, also called lecotropal (see below)
- Hourglass shape or hourglass figure, the one that resembles an hourglass; nearly symmetric shape wide at its ends and narrow in the middle; some flat shapes may be alternatively compared to the figure eight or hourglass
  - Dog bone shape, an hourglass with rounded ends
    - Dogbone space
  - Hourglass corset
  - Ntama
  - Engraved Hourglass Nebula
- Inverted bell
- Kite
- Lecotropal, in botany, shaped like a horseshoe (see horseshoe-shaped, above). From Greek λέκος dish + -τροπος turning
- Lens or Vesica shape (the latter taking its name from the shape of the lentil seed); see also mandorla, almond-shaped
  - Lens space
- Lune, from the Latin word for the Moon
- Maltese Cross curve
- Mandorla, almond-shaped (Italian for "almond"), often used as a frame in mediaeval Christian iconography.
- Mushroom shape, which became infamous as a result of the mushroom cloud
- Nephroid (from Ancient Greek ὁ νεφρός (ho nephros) 'kidney-shaped')
- Oval (from the Latin "ovum" for egg), a descriptive term applied to several kinds of "rounded" shapes, including the egg shape
- Pear shaped, in reference to the shape of a pear, i.e., a generally rounded shape, tapered towards the top and more spherical/circular at the bottom
- Rod, a 3-dimensional, solid (filled) cylinder
  - Rod shaped bacteria
- Rose, like the petals of a flower
  - Rose curve
  - Rose (topology)
- Salinon, meaning 'salt-cellar' in Greek
- Scarabaeus curve resembling a scarab
- Serpentine, shaped like a snake
  - Serpentine curve
- Snowflake, fractal branching structure with rotational symmetry (often of order 6)
  - Koch snowflake
  - Flowsnake
  - Mosely snowflake
- Stadium, two half-circles joined by straight sides
- Stirrup curve
- Star, a figure with multiple sharp points emanating from a common center
  - Star domain
  - Astroid
- Sunburst
  - Farey sunburst
- Tomahawk
- Tree, a figure with branches that do not rejoin that may also have branches that do not rejoin and so on.
  - Tree (graph theory)
- Ungula, shaped like a horse's hoof

== Numbers and letters ==
- A-shape, the shape that resembles the capital letter A
  - A-frame, the shape of a common structure that resembles the capital letter A
  - A-frame house, a common style of house construction
  - A-line skirt or dress
- B-shape, the shape that resembles the capital letter B
- C-shape, the shape that resembles the capital letter C
- D-shape, the shape that resembles the capital letter D
  - D-ring
- Deltoid, the shape that resembles the Greek capital letter Δ
  - Deltahedron
  - Y-Δ transform
  - Deltoid muscle
  - River delta
  - Delta wing
- E-shape, the shape that resembles the capital letter E
  - Magnetic cores of transformers may be E-shaped
  - A number of notable buildings have an E-shaped floorplan
- F-shape, the shape that resembles the capital letter F
- Figure 0, the shape that resembles the numeral 0, more commonly referred to as an O-shape, see below
- Figure 1, the shape that resembles the numeral 1
- Figure 2, the shape that resembles the numeral 2
- Figure 3, the shape that resembles the numeral 3
- Figure 4, the shape that resembles the numeral 4
- Figure 5, the shape that resembles the numeral 5
- Figure 6, the shape that resembles the numeral 6
- Figure 7, the shape that resembles the numeral 7
- Figure 8, the shape that resembles the numeral 8
  - Figure eight knot
  - Lemniscate
- Figure 9, the shape that resembles the numeral 9
- G-shape, the shape that resembles the capital letter G
- H-shape, the shape that resembles the capital letter H
  - H-beam, a beam with H-shaped section
  - Goals in several sports (gridiron football (old style), Gaelic football, rugby, hurling) are described as "H-shaped"
  - H topology in electronic filter design
  - Also see Balbis
- I-shape, the shape that resembles the capital letter Ɪ in a serif font, i.e., with horizontal strokes
  - Ɪ-beam, a beam with an Ɪ-shaped section
  - The court in the Mesoamerican ballgame is I-shaped
- J-shape, the shape that resembles the capital letter J
  - J curve
- K-shape, the shape that resembles the capital letter K
  - K-shaped recession
  - K turn
- Kappa curve, resembling the Greek letter ϰ (kappa).
- L-shape, the shape that resembles the capital letter L
  - L-beam, a beam with an L-shaped section
  - The L-Shaped Room
  - L game
  - L-shaped recession
- Lemniscate, the shape that resembles the infinity symbol
- M-shape, the shape that resembles the capital letter M (interchangeable with the W-shape)
- N-shape, the shape that resembles the capital letter N (interchangeable with the Z-shape)
- O-shape, the shape that resembles the capital letter O
  - O-ring
- P-shape, the shape that resembles the capital letter P
  - P-trap, a P-shaped pipe under a sink or basin
- Pi-shape, the shape that resembles the Greek capital letter Π
  - Π topology in electronic filter design
- Q-shape, the shape that resembles the capital letter Q
- R-shape, the shape that resembles the capital letter R
- S-shape, the shape that resembles the capital letter S
  - The sigmoid colon, an S-shaped bend in the human intestine
  - Sigmoid function
  - S-twist, contrasted with Z-twist for yarn

- T-shape, the shape that resembles the capital letter T
  - T junction
  - T topology in electronic filter design
  - T-shaped (chemistry)
  - T-shaped skills, a format for résumés
  - T-shirt
  - T-pose, used in computer animation models
- U-shape, the shape that resembles the capital letter U
  - U-shaped valley
  - U-turn
  - U-shaped recession
- Hyoid, the shape that resembles the Greek letter υ
  - Hyoid bone
- V-shape, the shape that resembles the letter V, also known as the Chevron (which includes the inverted-V shape)
  - V-shaped valley
  - V-shaped recession
  - V-shaped body – male human body shape with broad shoulders
  - V-shaped passage grave
  - V sign
  - V-tail
- W-shape, the shape that resembles the capital letter W (interchangeable with the M-shape)
  - W-shaped recession
- X-shape, the shape that resembles the letter X
  - Saltire
  - X topology in electronic filter design
- Chiasm, crossings that resemble the Greek letter χ
  - Chiasmus
  - Chiastic structure
  - Optic chiasm
- Y-shape, the shape that resembles the letter Y
  - Y-front briefs
  - Pall
  - Y-Δ transform
- Z-shape, the shape that resembles the capital letter Z (interchangeable with the N-shape)
  - Z-twist, contrasted with S-twist for yarn

== See also ==
- List of geometric shapes
- The Category:Curves lists numerous metaphorical names, such as
  - Bean curves, also called nephroids, from the Greek word for kidney
