= Perseus (geometer) =

2nd-century BC Ancient Greek geometer

Perseus (Greek: Περσεύς; c. 150 BC) was an ancient Greek geometer, who invented the concept of spiric sections, in analogy to the conic sections studied by Apollonius of Perga.

== Life ==
Few details of Perseus' life are known, as he is mentioned only by Proclus and Geminus; none of his own works have survived.

== Spiric sections ==
The spiric sections result from the intersection of a torus with a plane that is parallel to the rotational symmetry axis of the torus. Consequently, spiric sections are fourth-order (quartic) plane curves, whereas the conic sections are second-order (quadratic) plane curves. Spiric sections are a special case of a toric section, and were the first toric sections to be described.

=== Examples ===
The most famous spiric section is the Cassini oval, which is the locus of points having a constant product of distances to two foci. For comparison, an ellipse has a constant sum of focal distances, a hyperbola has a constant difference of focal distances, and a circle has a constant ratio of focal distances.
