= Lemniscate =

Figure-eight-shaped curve

The lemniscate of Bernoulli and its two foci

In algebraic geometry, a lemniscate (/lɛmˈnɪskɪt/ or /ˈlɛmnɪsˌkeɪt, -kɪt/) is any of several figure-eight or ∞-shaped curves. The word comes from the Latin lēmniscātus, meaning "decorated with ribbons", from the Greek λημνίσκος (lēmnískos), meaning "ribbon", or which alternatively may refer to the wool from which ribbons were made.

Curves that have been called a lemniscate include three quartic plane curves: the hippopede or lemniscate of Booth, the lemniscate of Bernoulli, and the lemniscate of Gerono. The hippopede was studied by Proclus (5th century), but the term "lemniscate" was not used until the work of Jacob Bernoulli in the late 17th century.

== History and examples ==
=== Lemniscate of Booth ===
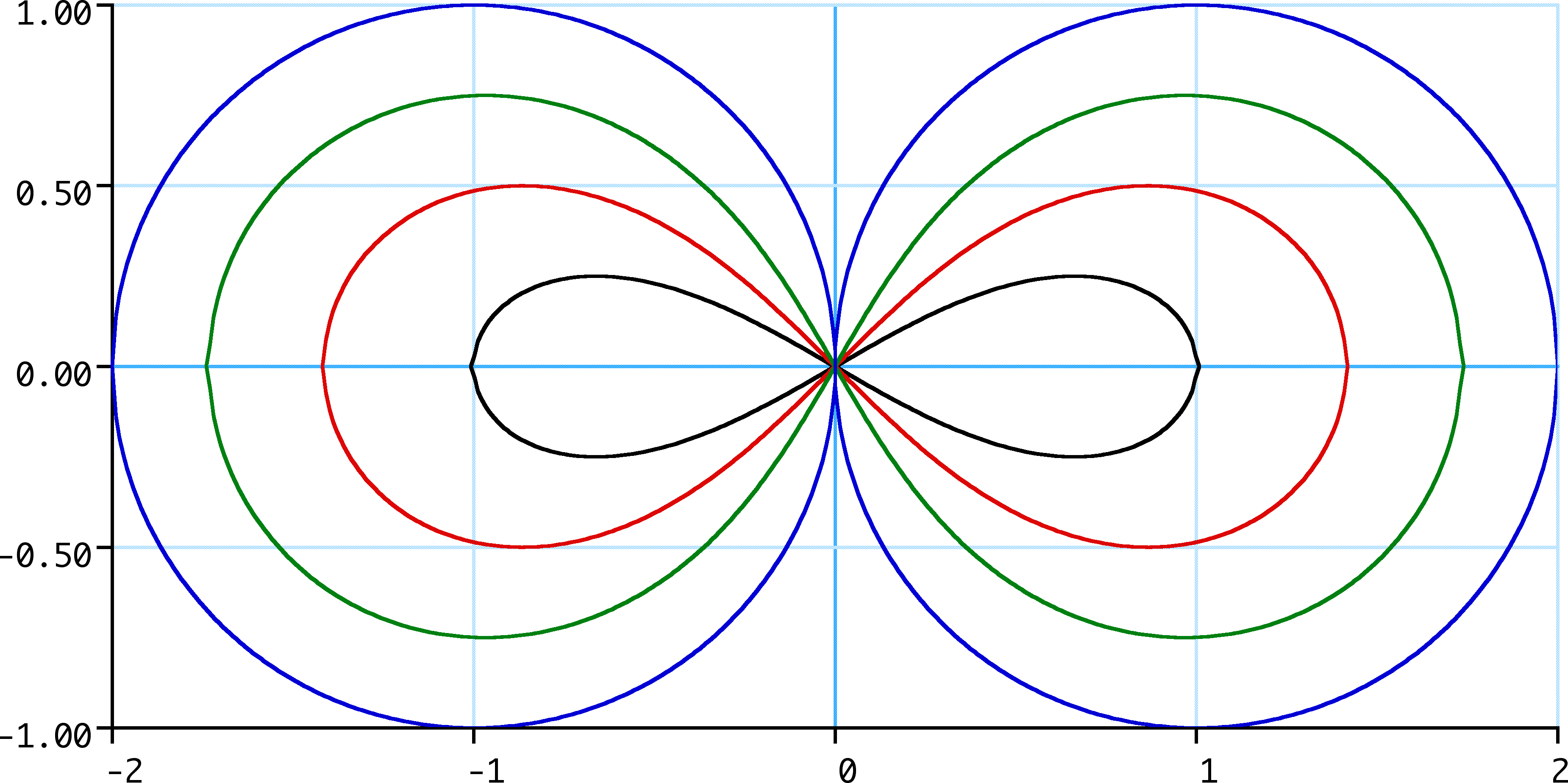
Lemniscate of Booth

The consideration of curves with a figure-eight shape can be traced back to Proclus, a Greek Neoplatonist philosopher and mathematician who lived in the 5th century AD. Proclus considered the cross-sections of a torus by a plane parallel to the axis of the torus. As he observed, for most such sections the cross section consists of either one or two ovals; however, when the plane is tangent to the inner surface of the torus, the cross-section takes on a figure-eight shape, which Proclus called a horse fetter (a device for holding two feet of a horse together), or "hippopede" in Greek. The name "lemniscate of Booth" for this curve dates to its study by the 19th-century mathematician James Booth.

The lemniscate may be defined as an algebraic curve, the zero set of the quartic polynomial $(x^2 + y^2)^2 - cx^2 - dy^2$ when the parameter d is negative (or zero for the special case where the lemniscate becomes a pair of externally tangent circles). For positive values of d one instead obtains the oval of Booth.

=== Lemniscate of Bernoulli ===
Lemniscate of Bernoulli

In 1680, Cassini studied a family of curves, now called the Cassini oval, defined as follows: the locus of all points, the product of whose distances from two fixed points, the curves' foci, is a constant. Under very particular circumstances (when the half-distance between the points is equal to the square root of the constant) this gives rise to a lemniscate.

In 1694, Johann Bernoulli studied the lemniscate case of the Cassini oval, now known as the lemniscate of Bernoulli (shown above), in connection with a problem of "isochrones" that had been posed earlier by Leibniz. Like the hippopede, it is an algebraic curve, the zero set of the polynomial $(x^2 + y^2)^2 - a^2 (x^2 - y^2)$. Bernoulli's brother Jacob Bernoulli also studied the same curve in the same year, and gave it its name, the lemniscate. It may also be defined geometrically as the locus of points whose product of distances from two foci equals the square of half the interfocal distance. It is a special case of the hippopede (lemniscate of Booth), with $d=-c$, and may be formed as a cross-section of a torus whose inner hole and circular cross-sections have the same diameter as each other. The lemniscatic elliptic functions are analogues of trigonometric functions for the lemniscate of Bernoulli, and the lemniscate constants arise in evaluating the arc length of this lemniscate.

=== Lemniscate of Gerono ===
Lemniscate of Gerono: solution set of x^{4} − x^{2} + y^{2} = 0

Another lemniscate, the lemniscate of Gerono or lemniscate of Huygens, is the zero set of the quartic polynomial $y^2-x^2(a^2-x^2)$. Viviani's curve, a three-dimensional curve formed by intersecting a sphere with a cylinder, also has a figure eight shape, and has the lemniscate of Gerono as its planar projection.

=== Others ===
Other figure-eight shaped algebraic curves include

- The Devil's curve, a curve defined by the quartic equation $y^2 (y^2 - a^2) = x^2 (x^2 - b^2)$ in which one connected component has a figure-eight shape,
- Watt's curve, a figure-eight shaped curve formed by a mechanical linkage. Watt's curve is the zero set of the degree-six polynomial equation $(x^2+y^2)(x^2+y^2-d^2)^2+4a^2y^2(x^2+y^2-b^2)=0$ and has the lemniscate of Bernoulli as a special case.

== See also ==
- Analemma, the figure-eight shaped curve traced by the noontime positions of the sun in the sky over the course of a year
- Infinity symbol, in the shape of a lemniscate
- Lemniscates as generalized conics
- Lorenz attractor, a three-dimensional dynamic system exhibiting a lemniscate shape
- Polynomial lemniscate, a level set of the absolute value of a complex polynomial
