= Butterfly curve =

Butterfly curve may refer to:

- Butterfly curve (algebraic), a curve defined by a trinomial
- Butterfly curve (transcendental), a curve based on sine functions
