= Plane quartic curve =

Plane algebraic curve defined by a 4th-degree polynomial

In algebraic geometry, a plane quartic curve is a plane algebraic curve of the fourth degree. It can be defined by a bivariate quartic equation:

$$Ax^4+By^4+Cx^3y+Dx^2y^2+Exy^3+Fx^3+Gy^3+Hx^2y+Ixy^2+Jx^2+Ky^2+Lxy+Mx+Ny+P=0,$$

with at least one of A, B, C, D, E not equal to zero. This equation has 15 constants. However, it can be multiplied by any non-zero constant without changing the curve; thus by the choice of an appropriate constant of multiplication, any one of the coefficients can be set to 1, leaving only 14 constants. Therefore, the space of quartic curves can be identified with the real projective space $\mathbb{RP}^{14}.$ It also follows, from Cramer's theorem on algebraic curves, that there is exactly one quartic curve that passes through a set of 14 distinct points in general position, since a quartic has 14 degrees of freedom.

A quartic curve can have a maximum of:

- Four connected components
- Twenty-eight bi-tangents
- Three ordinary double points.

One may also consider quartic curves over other fields (or even rings), for instance the complex numbers. In this way, one gets Riemann surfaces, which are one-dimensional objects over $\C,$ but are two-dimensional over $\R.$ An example is the Klein quartic. Additionally, one can look at curves in the projective plane, given by homogeneous polynomials.

== Examples ==
Various combinations of coefficients in the above equation give rise to various important families of curves as listed below.

- Bicorn
- Bullet-nose curve
- Cartesian oval
- Cassini oval
- Deltoid curve
- Devil's curve
- Hippopede
- Kampyle of Eudoxus
- Klein quartic
- Lemniscate
  - Lemniscate of Bernoulli
  - Lemniscate of Gerono
- Limaçon
- Lüroth quartic
- Spiric section
- Squircle
  - Lamé's special quartic
- Toric section
- Trott curve

Ampersand curve

Bean curve

Bicuspid curve

Bow curve

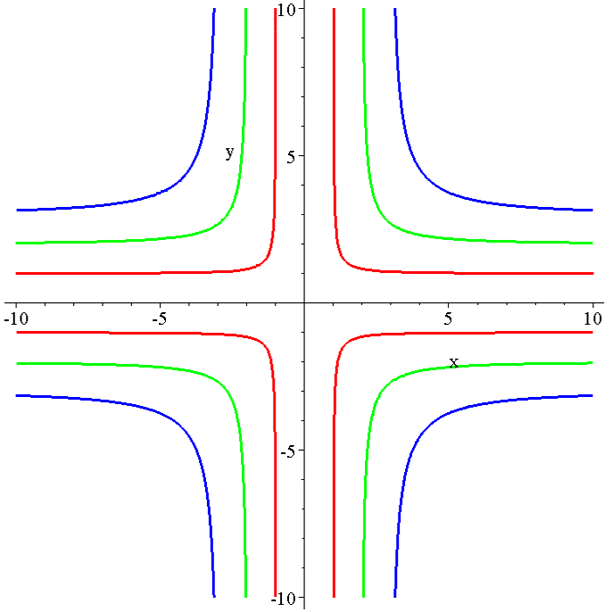
Cruciform curve with parameters (b,a) being (1,1) in red; (2,2) in green; (3,3) in blue.

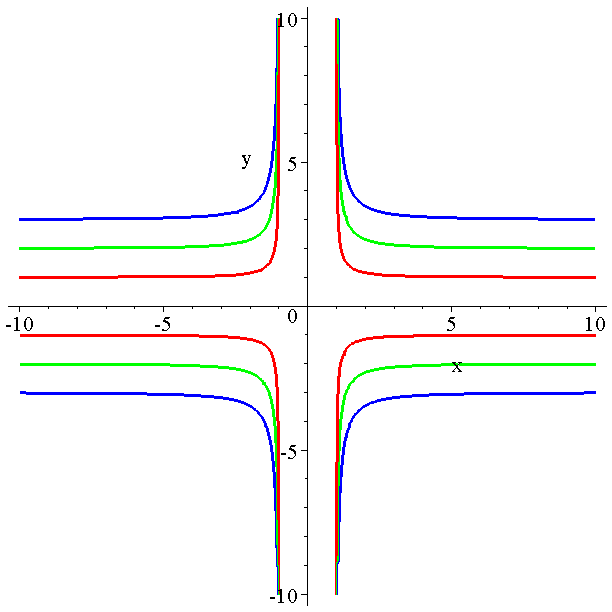
Cruciform curve with parameters (b,a) being (1,1) in red; (2,1) in green; (3,1) in blue.

Spiric section

Three-leaved clover in Cartesian coordinates

Three-leaved clover in polar coordinates

=== Ampersand curve ===
The ampersand curve is a quartic plane curve given by the equation:

$$\  (y^2-x^2)(x-1)(2x-3)=4(x^2+y^2-2x)^2.$$

It has genus zero, with three ordinary double points, all in the real plane.

=== Bean curve ===
The bean curve is a quartic plane curve with the equation:

$$x^4+x^2y^2+y^4=x(x^2+y^2). \,$$

The bean curve has genus zero. It has one singularity at the origin, an ordinary triple point.

=== Bicuspid curve ===
The bicuspid is a quartic plane curve with the equation

$$(x^2-a^2)(x-a)^2+(y^2-a^2)^2=0 \,$$

where a determines the size of the curve. The bicuspid has only the two cusps as singularities, and hence is a curve of genus one.

=== Bow curve ===
The bow curve is a quartic plane curve with the equation:

$$x^4=x^2y-y^3. \,$$

The bow curve has a single triple point at x=0, y=0, and consequently is a rational curve, with genus zero.

=== Cruciform curve ===
The cruciform curve, or cross curve is a quartic plane curve given by the equation

$$x^2y^2-b^2x^2-a^2y^2=0 \,$$

where a and b are two parameters determining the shape of the curve. The cruciform curve is related by a standard quadratic transformation, x ↦ 1/x, y ↦ 1/y to the ellipse a^{2}x^{2} + b^{2}y^{2} = 1, and is therefore a rational plane algebraic curve of genus zero. The cruciform curve has three double points in the real projective plane, at x=0 and y=0, x=0 and z=0, and y=0 and z=0.

Because the curve is rational, it can be parametrized by rational functions. For instance, if a=1 and b=2, then

$$x = -\frac{t^2-2t+5}{t^2-2t-3},\quad y = \frac{t^2-2t+5}{2t-2}$$

parametrizes the points on the curve outside of the exceptional cases where a denominator is zero.

Illustration of the inverse Pythagorean and regular Pythagorean theorems

The inverse Pythagorean theorem is obtained from the above equation by substituting x with AC, y with BC, and each a and b with CD, where A, B are the endpoints of the hypotenuse of a right triangle ABC, and D is the foot of a perpendicular dropped from C, the vertex of the right angle, to the hypotenuse:

$$\begin{align}
AC^2 BC^2 - CD^2 AC^2 - CD^2 BC^2 &= 0
\\ AC^2 BC^2                         &= CD^2 BC^2 + CD^2 AC^2
\\ \frac{1}{CD^2}                    &= \frac{BC^2}{AC^2 \cdot BC^2} + \frac{AC^2}{AC^2 \cdot BC^2}
\\ \therefore \;\; \frac{1}{CD^2}    &= \frac{  1 }{AC^2           } + \frac{  1 }{           BC^2}
\end{align}$$

=== Spiric section ===
Spiric sections can be defined as bicircular quartic curves that are symmetric with respect to the x and y axes. Spiric sections are included in the family of toric sections and include the family of hippopedes and the family of Cassini ovals. The name is from σπειρα meaning torus in ancient Greek.

The Cartesian equation can be written as

$$(x^2+y^2)^2=dx^2+ey^2+f ,$$

and the equation in polar coordinates as

$$r^4=dr^2\cos^2\theta+er^2\sin^2\theta+f. \,$$

=== Three-leaved clover (trifolium) ===
The three-leaved clover or trifolium is the quartic plane curve

$$x^4+2x^2y^2+y^4-x^3+3xy^2=0. \,$$

By solving for y, the curve can be described by the following function:

$$y=\pm\sqrt{\frac{-2x^2-3x\pm\sqrt{16x^3+9x^2}}{2}},$$

where the two appearances of ± are independent of each other, giving up to four distinct values of y for each x.

The parametric equation of curve is

$x = \cos(3t) \cos t,\quad y = \cos(3t) \sin t. \,$

In polar coordinates (x = r cos φ, y = r sin φ) the equation is

$$r = \cos(3\varphi). \,$$

It is a special case of rose curve with k = 3. This curve has a triple point at the origin (0, 0) and has three double tangents.

== See also ==
- Ternary quartic
- Bitangents of a quartic
