= Gerhard Christoph Hermann Vechtmann =

German mathematician

Gerhard Christoph Hermann Vechtmann (10 April 1817 – 2 August 1857) was a German mathematician, who is best known for his work on lemniscates.

Vechtman was born in Wittmund in the northern part of the Kingdom of Hanover in Germany, where his father worked as a preacher. From the ages 10 to 15 he attended the local school in Wittmund before attending the gymnasium (high school) in neighbouring Aurich for three years. After school Vechtmann went on to study math and sciences in Berlin and Göttingen. In Göttingen he became a member of the pedagogic seminar (institute for teacher education) and taught at the local gymnasium until he was appointed Hofmeister at the Ritterakademie in Lüneburg in 1841. In 1843 he handed in his dissertation De curvis lemniscatis at the University of Göttingen and was awarded a Doctor of Philosophy. At the end of 1845 he became a teacher for math and sciences at a school in Eutin and 1848 he was made the vice principal at school in Meldorf. Finally he was made the principal of the newly founded gymnasium in Rendsburg in 1856. On 18 July 1857 he left Rendsburg with his wife and his two children for a vacation at his in-laws. There he suddenly fell ill and died within three days on 2 August 1857.

In his dissertation De curvis lemniscatis he examined the lemniscate of Bernoulli and discovered a surprising property of certain angles occurring in it.

== Works ==
- De curvis leminiscatis. Dissertation, Göttingen, 1843 (online copy)
