= Toric section =

A toric section is an intersection of a plane with a torus, just as a conic section is the intersection of a plane with a cone. Special cases have been known since antiquity, and the general case was studied by Jean Gaston Darboux.

== Mathematical formulae ==
In general, toric sections are fourth-order (quartic) plane curves of the form

$$\left( x^2 + y^2 \right)^2 + a x^2 + b y^2 + cx + dy + e = 0.$$

== Spiric sections ==
A special case of a toric section is the spiric section, in which the intersecting plane is parallel to the rotational symmetry axis of the torus. They were discovered by the ancient Greek geometer Perseus in roughly 150 BC. Well-known examples include the hippopede and the Cassini oval and their relatives, such as the lemniscate of Bernoulli.

== Villarceau circles ==
Another special case is the Villarceau circles, in which the intersection is a circle despite the lack of any of the obvious sorts of symmetry that would entail a circular cross-section.

== General toric sections ==
More complicated figures such as an annulus can be created when the intersecting plane is perpendicular or oblique to the rotational symmetry axis.
