= St Anne's Church, Wandsworth =

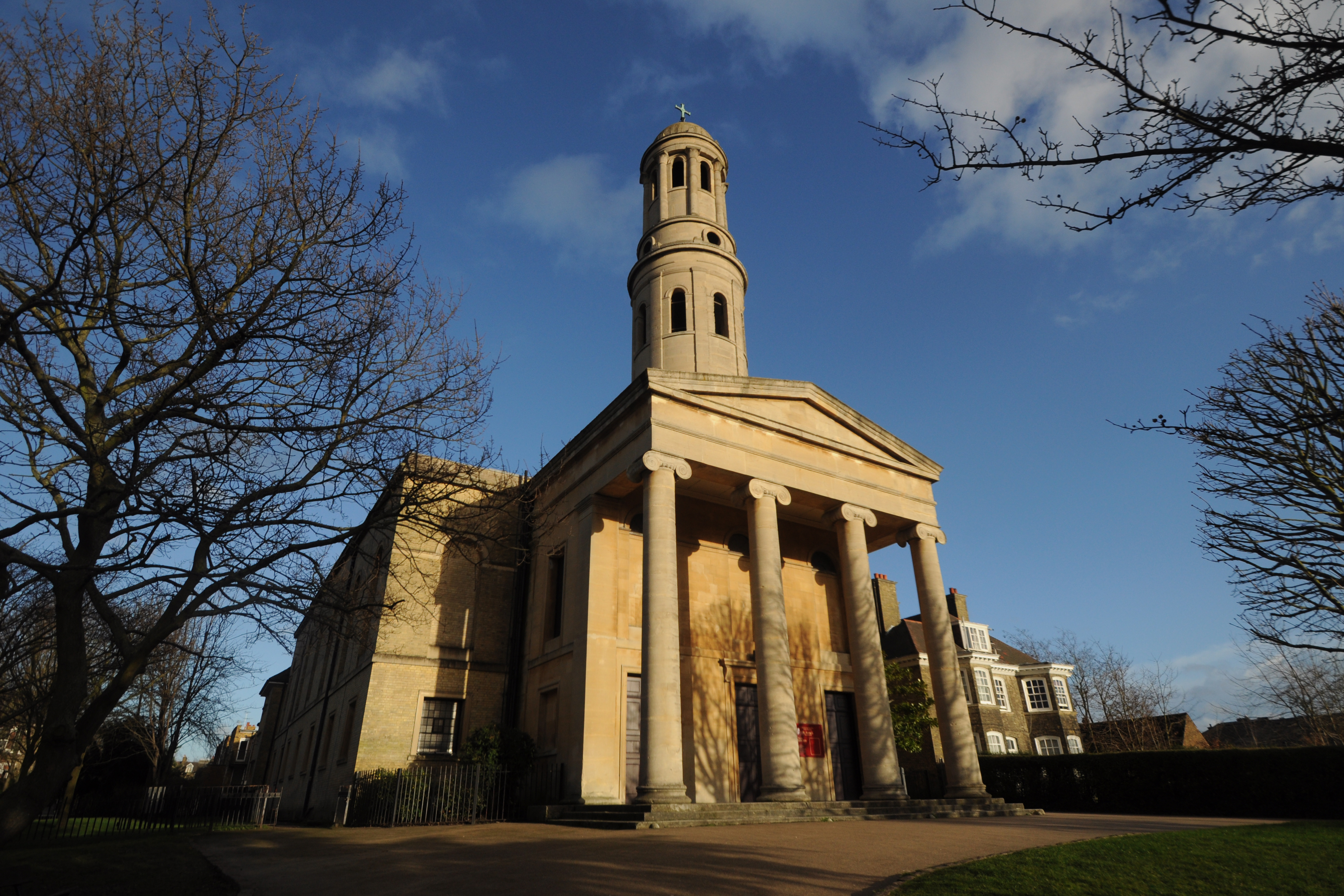

- Location within London Borough of Wandsworth
- 51.4550°N 0.1875°W
- Location: London
- Country: England
- Denomination: Church of England
- Website: stanneswandsworth.org.uk

Architecture
- Architect: Robert Smirke
- Style: Greek Revival

St Anne's Church, Wandsworth, is a Grade II* listed church on St Ann's Hill, Wandsworth, London.

== History ==
A Commissioners' church, it was built from 1820 to 1824. It was designed by the architect Robert Smirke in Greek Revival style. Smirke also used the tower design for St Mary's, Bryanston Square and St Philip's Church, Salford, although these two churches have semicircular porticos unlike that of St Anne's.

== Notable people ==
- Bertram Cunningham, later Principal of Westcott House, Cambridge, served his curacy here in the 1890s
- James Booth, minister from 1854
