= Hippopede =

Class of quartic plane curves

Hippopede (red) given as the pedal curve of an ellipse (black). The equation of this hippopede is: $4x^2 + y^2 = (x^2 + y^2)^2$

In geometry, a hippopede (from Ancient Greek ἱπποπέδη (hippopédē) 'horse fetter') is a plane curve determined by an equation of the form

$$(x^2+y^2)^2=cx^2+dy^2,$$

where it is assumed that c > 0 and c > d since the remaining cases either reduce to a single point or can be put into the given form with a rotation. Hippopedes are bicircular, rational, algebraic curves of degree 4 and symmetric with respect to both the x and y axes.

== Special cases ==
When d > 0 the curve has an oval form and is often known as an oval of Booth, and when d < 0 the curve resembles a sideways figure eight, or lemniscate, and is often known as a lemniscate of Booth, after 19th-century mathematician James Booth who studied them. Hippopedes were also investigated by Proclus (for whom they are sometimes called Hippopedes of Proclus) and Eudoxus. For d = −c, the hippopede corresponds to the lemniscate of Bernoulli.

== Definition as spiric sections ==
Hippopedes with a = 1, b = 0.1, 0.2, 0.5, 1.0, 1.5, and 2.0.

Hippopedes with b = 1, a = 0.1, 0.2, 0.5, 1.0, 1.5, and 2.0.

Hippopedes can be defined as the curve formed by the intersection of a torus and a plane, where the plane is parallel to the axis of the torus and tangent to it on the interior circle. Thus it is a spiric section which in turn is a type of toric section.

If a circle with radius a is rotated about an axis at distance b from its center, then the equation of the resulting hippopede in polar coordinates

$$r^2 = 4 b (a - b \sin^{2}\! \theta)$$

or in Cartesian coordinates

$$(x^2+y^2)^2+4b(b-a)(x^2+y^2)=4b^2x^2$$.

Note that when a > b the torus intersects itself, so it does not resemble the usual picture of a torus.

== See also ==
- List of curves
