= Bicorn =

Mathematical curve with two cusps

Bicorn

In geometry, the bicorn, also known as a cocked hat curve due to its resemblance to a bicorne, is a rational quartic curve defined by the equation
$$y^2 \left(a^2 - x^2\right) = \left(x^2 + 2ay - a^2\right)^2.$$
It has two cusps and is symmetric about the y-axis.

== History ==
In 1864, James Joseph Sylvester studied the curve
$$y^4 - xy^3 - 8xy^2 + 36x^2y+ 16x^2 -27x^3 = 0$$
in connection with the classification of quintic equations; he named the curve a bicorn because it has two cusps. This curve was further studied by Arthur Cayley in 1867.

== Properties ==
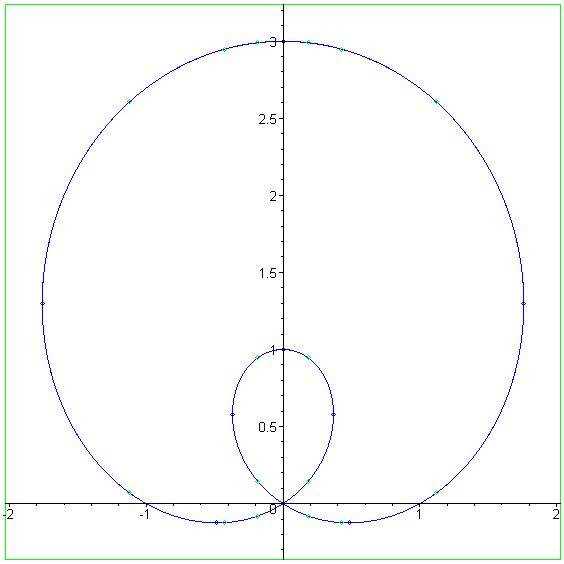
A transformed bicorn with a = 1

The bicorn is a plane algebraic curve of degree four and genus zero. It has two cusp singularities in the real plane, and a double point in the complex projective plane at $(x=0, z=0)$. If we move $x=0$ and $z=0$ to the origin and perform an imaginary rotation on $x$ by substituting $ix/z$ for $x$ and $1/z$ for $y$ in the bicorn curve, we obtain
$$\left(x^2 - 2az + a^2 z^2\right)^2 = x^2 + a^2 z^2.$$
This curve, a limaçon, has an ordinary double point at the origin, and two nodes in the complex plane, at $x= \pm i$ and $z=1$.

The parametric equations of a bicorn curve are
$$\begin{align}
x &= a \sin\theta \\
y &= a \, \frac{(2 + \cos\theta) \cos^2\theta}{3 + \sin^2\theta}
\end{align}$$
with $-\pi \le \theta \le \pi.$

== See also ==
- List of curves
