= Kampyle of Eudoxus =

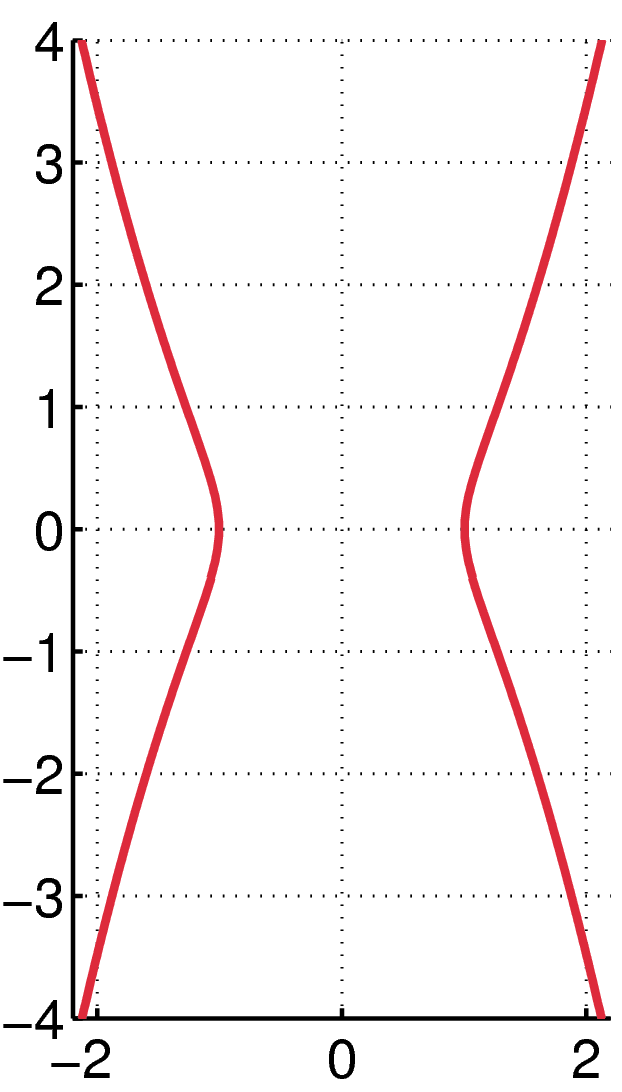
Graph of Kampyle of Eudoxus with a = 1

The kampyle of Eudoxus (Greek: καμπύλη [γραμμή], meaning simply "curved [line], curve") is a curve with a Cartesian equation of

$$x^4 = a^2(x^2+y^2),$$

from which the solution x = y = 0 is excluded.

== Alternative parameterizations ==
In polar coordinates, the Kampyle has the equation

$$r = a\sec^2\theta.$$

Equivalently, it has a parametric representation as

$$x=a\sec(t), \quad y=a\tan(t)\sec(t).$$

== History ==
This quartic curve was studied by the Greek astronomer and mathematician Eudoxus of Cnidus (c. 408 BC – c.347 BC) in relation to the classical problem of doubling the cube.

== Properties ==
The Kampyle is symmetric about both the x- and y-axes. It crosses the x-axis at (±a,0). It has inflection points at

$$\left(\pm a\frac{\sqrt{6}}{2},\pm a\frac{\sqrt{3}}{2}\right)$$

(four inflections, one in each quadrant). The top half of the curve is asymptotic to $x^2/a-a/2$ as $x \to \infty$, and in fact can be written as

$$y = \frac{x^2}{a}\sqrt{1-\frac{a^2}{x^2}} = \frac{x^2}{a} - \frac{a}{2} \sum_{n=0}^\infty C_n\left(\frac{a}{2x}\right)^{2n},$$

where

$$C_n = \frac1{n+1} \binom{2n}{n}$$

is the $n$th Catalan number.

== See also ==
- List of curves
