= Bertram Cunningham =

British Anglican priest and academic

The Reverend Canon Bertram Cunningham OBE KHC
- Principal of Westcott House, Cambridge
- Church: Church of England
- In office: 1919 to 1943
- Predecessor: Charles Lambert
- Successor: William Greer

Orders
- Ordination: c. 1897

Personal details
- Born: Bertram Keir Cunningham; 26 February 1871
- Died: 10 September 1944 (aged 73)
- Denomination: Anglicanism

Bertram Keir Cunningham OBE KHC (26 March 1871 – 10 September 1944), also known as B. K. Cunningham, was a British Anglican priest and academic. From 1919 to 1943, he was principal of Westcott House, Cambridge, a Church of England theological college.

== Ordained ministry ==
Cunningham worked with the Cambridge University Mission to Delhi and also as a lay minister in the Diocese of Lahore. In 1897, he returned to the United Kingdom, and was ordained in the Church of England. He then served his curacy at St Anne's Church, Wandsworth in the Diocese of Southwark. From 1900 to 1917, he served as Warden of the Bishops' Hostel, Farnham in Surrey. This was a small, local theological college mainly attended by older men. He was made an honorary canon of Winchester Cathedral in 1908.

On 20 March 1917, Cunningham was commissioned into the Army Chaplains' Department as a temporary Chaplain to the Forces 4th Class (equivalent in rank to captain). One of his duties during the First World War was to run retreats for those serving as chaplains. He was also the principal of the Chaplains' School in Saint-Omer, France, that provided the training to turn vicars into military chaplains. On 21 March 1919, he relinquished his commission and was appointed an honorary Chaplain to the Forces 3rd Class (equivalent to major).

In 1919, Cunningham was appointed Principal of Westcott House, Cambridge. His first duty was to re-open the theological college, as it had been closed during the First World War. He retired as principal at the end of 1943 due to his failing health.

== Later life ==
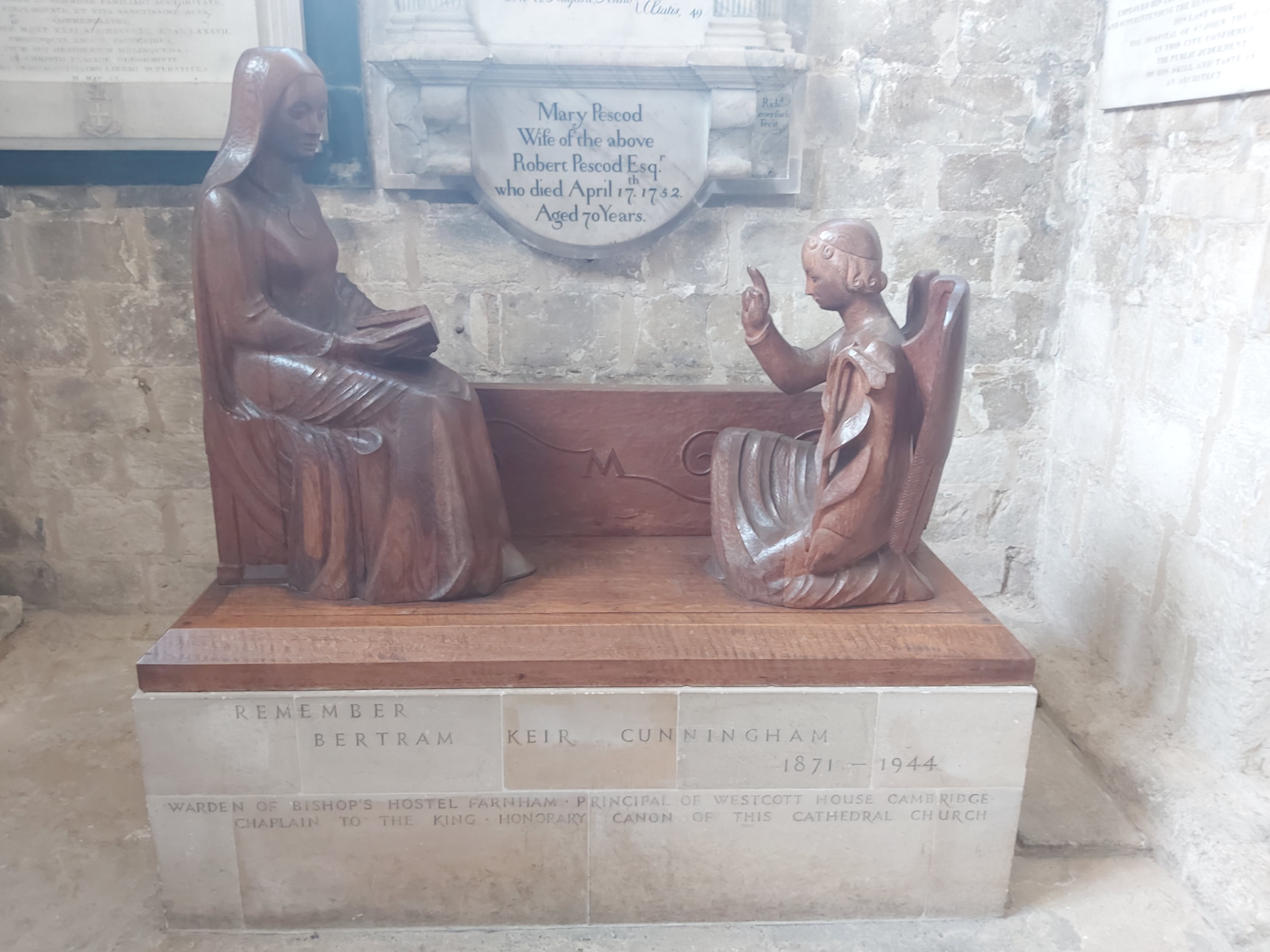
Memorial for Bertram Keir Cunningham in Winchester Cathedral

Cunningham died on 10 September 1944 in London, England. His funeral was held on 13 September 1944 at the Church of St John the Evangelist, Edinburgh.

== Honours ==
In March 1920, Cunningham was appointed an Honorary Chaplain to The King (KHC).

== Selected works ==
- Cunningham, B. K. (1913). Studies in New Testament Thought. London: Student Christian Movement.
- Cunningham, B. K., ed. (1932). A Man's Job? What it Means to be a Parson. London: Student Christian Movement Press.
