= Circular algebraic curve =

Plane algebraic curve

In geometry, a circular algebraic curve is a type of plane algebraic curve determined by an equation F(x, y) = 0, where F is a polynomial with real coefficients and the highest-order terms of F form a polynomial divisible by x^{2} + y^{2}. More precisely, if F = F_{n} + F_{n−1} + ... + F_{1} + F_{0}, where each F_{i} is homogeneous of degree i, then the curve F(x, y) = 0 is circular if and only if F_{n} is divisible by x^{2} + y^{2}.

Equivalently, if the curve is determined in homogeneous coordinates by G(x, y, z) = 0, where G is a homogeneous polynomial, then the curve is circular if and only if G(1, i, 0) = G(1, −i, 0) = 0. In other words, the curve is circular if it contains the circular points at infinity, (1, i, 0) and (1, −i, 0), when considered as a curve in the complex projective plane.

== Multicircular algebraic curves ==
An algebraic curve is called p-circular if it contains the points (1, i, 0) and (1, −i, 0) when considered as a curve in the complex projective plane, and these points are singularities of order at least p. The terms bicircular, tricircular, etc. apply when p = 2, 3, etc. In terms of the polynomial F given above, the curve F(x, y) = 0 is p-circular if F_{n−i} is divisible by (x^{2} + y^{2})^{p−i} when i < p. When p = 1 this reduces to the definition of a circular curve. The set of p-circular curves is invariant under Euclidean transformations. Note that a p-circular curve must have degree at least 2p.

The set of p-circular curves of degree p + k, where p may vary but k is a fixed positive integer, is invariant under inversion. When k is 1 this says that the set of lines (0-circular curves of degree 1) together with the set of circles (1-circular curves of degree 2) form a set which is invariant under inversion.

== Examples ==
- The circle is the only circular conic.
- Conchoids of de Sluze (which include several well-known cubic curves) are circular cubics.
- Cassini ovals (including the lemniscate of Bernoulli), toric sections and limaçons (including the cardioid) are bicircular quartics.
- Watt's curve is a tricircular sextic.
