= Polynomial lemniscate =

Plane algebraic curve

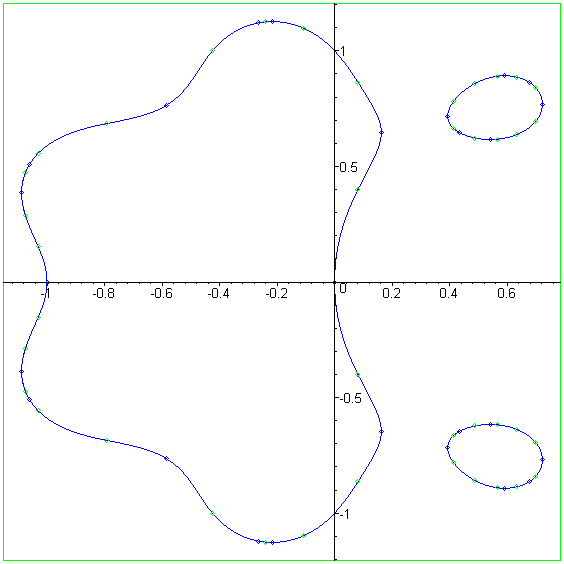
$|z^6+z^5+z^4+z^3+$ $z^2+z+1|=1$

In mathematics, a polynomial lemniscate or polynomial level curve is a plane algebraic curve of degree 2n, constructed from a polynomial p with complex coefficients of degree n.

For any such polynomial p and positive real number c, we may define a set of complex numbers by $|p(z)| = c.$ This set of numbers may be equated to points in the real Cartesian plane, leading to an algebraic curve ƒ(x, y) = c^{2} of degree 2n, which results from expanding out $p(z) \bar p(\bar z)$ in terms of z = x + iy.

When p is a polynomial of degree 1 then the resulting curve is simply a circle whose center is the zero of p. When p is a polynomial of degree 2 then the curve is a Cassini oval.

== Erdős lemniscate ==
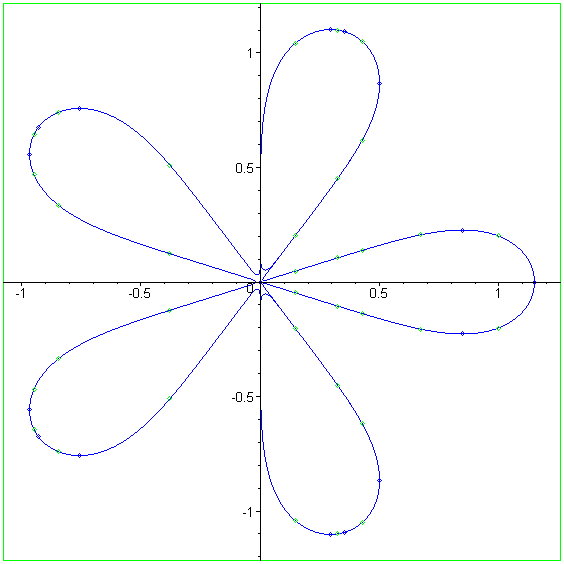
Erdős lemniscate of degree ten and genus six

A conjecture of Erdős which has attracted considerable interest concerns the maximum arc length of a polynomial lemniscate f(x, y) = 1 of degree 2n when p is monic, which Erdős conjectured was attained when p(z) = z^{n} − 1. This is still not proved but Fryntov and Nazarov proved that p gives a local maximum. In the case when n = 2, the Erdős lemniscate is the Lemniscate of Bernoulli

$$(x^2+y^2)^2=2(x^2-y^2)\,$$

and it has been proven that this is indeed the maximal length in degree four. The Erdős lemniscate has three ordinary n-fold points, one of which is at the origin, and a genus of (n − 1)(n − 2)/2. By inverting the Erdős lemniscate in the unit circle, one obtains a nonsingular curve of degree n.

== Generic polynomial lemniscate ==
In general, a polynomial lemniscate will not touch at the origin, and will have only two ordinary n-fold singularities, and hence a genus of (n − 1)^{2}. As a real curve, it can have a number of disconnected components. Hence, it will not look like a lemniscate, making the name something of a misnomer.

An interesting example of such polynomial lemniscates are the Mandelbrot curves. If we set p_{0} = z, and p_{n} = p_{n−1}^{2} + z, then the corresponding polynomial lemniscates M_{n} defined by |p_{n}(z)| = 2 converge to the boundary of the Mandelbrot set. The Mandelbrot curves are of degree 2^{n+1}.
