= Circular points at infinity =

In projective geometry, the circular points at infinity (also called cyclic points or isotropic points) are two special points at infinity in the complex projective plane that are contained in the complexification of every real circle.

== Coordinates ==
A point of the complex projective plane may be described in terms of homogeneous coordinates, being a triple of complex numbers (x : y : z), where two triples describe the same point of the plane when the coordinates of one triple become the same as those of the other after being multiplied by some fixed nonzero factor. In this system, the points at infinity may be chosen as those whose z-coordinate is zero. The two circular points at infinity are two of these, usually taken to be those with homogeneous coordinates

(1 : i : 0) and (1 : −i : 0).

=== Trilinear coordinates ===
Let A. B. C be the measures of the vertex angles of the reference triangle ABC. Then the trilinear coordinates of the circular points at infinity in the plane of the reference triangle are as given below:

$$-1 : \cos C - i\sin C : \cos B + i\sin B,\qquad -1 : \cos C + i\sin C : \cos B - i\sin B$$

or, equivalently,

$$\cos C + i\sin C : -1 :\cos A - i\sin A, \qquad\cos C - i\sin C : -1 :\cos A + i\sin A$$

or, again equivalently,

$$\cos B + i\sin B : \cos A - i\sin A : -1, \qquad \cos B-i\sin B : \cos A+i\sin A: -1,$$

where $i=\sqrt{-1}$.

== Complexified circles ==
A real circle, defined by its center point (x_{0},y_{0}) and radius r (all three of which are real numbers) may be described as the set of real solutions to the equation

$$(x-x_0)^2+(y-y_0)^2=r^2.$$

Converting this into a homogeneous equation and taking the set of all complex-number solutions gives the complexification of the circle. The two circular points have their name because they lie on the complexification of every real circle. More generally, both points satisfy the homogeneous equations of the type

$$Ax^2 + Ay^2 + 2B_1xz + 2B_2yz - Cz^2 = 0.$$

The case where the coefficients are all real gives the equation of a general circle (of the real projective plane). In general, an algebraic curve that passes through these two points is called circular.

== Additional properties ==
The circular points at infinity are the points at infinity of the isotropic lines. They are invariant under translations and rotations of the plane.

The concept of angle can be defined using the circular points, natural logarithm and cross-ratio:

The angle between two lines is the logarithm of the cross-ratio of the pencil formed by the two lines and the lines joining their intersection to the circular points, divided by 2i.

Sommerville configures two lines on the origin as $u : y = x \tan \theta, \quad u' : y = x \tan \theta '.$ Denoting the circular points as ω and ω′, he obtains the cross ratio

$(u u' , \omega \omega ') = \frac{\tan \theta - i}{\tan \theta + i} \div \frac{\tan \theta ' - i}{\tan \theta ' + i} ,$ so that
$$\phi = \theta ' - \theta = \tfrac{i}{2} \log (u u', \omega \omega ') .$$

== Imaginary transformation ==
The transformation $x' = x, \quad y' = iy, \quad z' = z$ is called the imaginary transformation by Felix Klein. He notes that the equation $x^2 + y^2 = 0$ becomes $x'^2 - y'^2 = 0$ under the transformation, which

changes the imaginary circular points x : y = ± i, z = 0, into the real infinitely distant points x’ : y’ = ± 1, z = 0, which are the points at infinity in the two directions that make an angle of 45° with the axes. Thus all circles are transformed into conics which go through these two real infinitely distant points, i.e. into equilateral hyperbolas whose asymptotes make an angle of 45° with the axes.
