= Von Neumann's elephant =

Problem in recreational mathematics

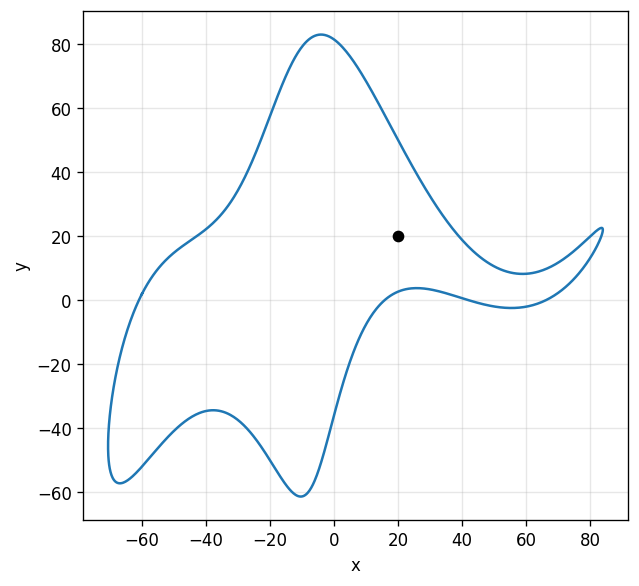
Fermi–von Neumann elephant (4 complex parameters, 2010)

In recreational mathematics, von Neumann's elephant is a problem of constructing a planar curve in the shape of an elephant from only four fixed parameters. It originated from a discussion between physicists John von Neumann and Enrico Fermi, and the expression is used in physics to characterize a model with so many parameters that it is overfit, will consequently match any set of experimental data, and therefore is unfalsifiable and unscientific.

== History ==
In a 2004 article in the journal Nature, Freeman Dyson recounts his meeting with Fermi in 1953. Fermi, while discussing a novel theory Dyson was proposing, offered the harsh critique: "There are two ways of doing calculations in theoretical physics. One way ... is to have a clear physical picture of the process that you are calculating. The other way is to have a precise and self-consistent mathematical formalism. You have neither." Dyson countered by stating that his theory matched Fermi's own data. Fermi asked about a number of arbitrary parameters Dyson used and, upon learning that there were four of them, quoted his friend von Neumann:

With four parameters I can fit an elephant, and with five I can make him wiggle his trunk.

By this he meant that the Dyson's simulations relied on too many free parameters, presupposing an overfitting phenomenon. "Stunned" Dyson agreed with the argument, finished the set of articles in order for his students to get their names into the research journals, and switched to another field of study.

The phrase became popular enough to be used in the titles of unrelated research works, like "There is More Than One Way to Model an Elephant. Experiment-Driven Modeling of the Actin Cytoskeleton".

== Construction ==
Over time, solving the problem (defining four complex numbers to draw an elephantine shape) became a topic in recreational mathematics. A 1975 attempt through least-squares function approximation required dozens of terms. An approximation using four parameters was found by three physicists in 2010.

The construction is based on complex Fourier analysis.

The curve found in 2010 is parameterized by
$$\begin{align}
x(t) &= -60\cos t + 30\sin t - 8\sin 2t + 10\sin 3t, \\
y(t) &= 50\sin t + 18\sin 2t - 12\cos 3t + 14\cos 5t.
\end{align}$$

The four fixed parameters used are complex, with affixes z_{1} = 50 − 30i, z_{2} = 18 + 8i, z_{3} = 12 − 10i, z_{4} = −14 − 60i. The affix point z_{5} = 40 + 20i is added to make the eye of the elephant, and this value also serves as a parameter for the movement of the "trunk".

== Other von Neumann elephants ==
Von Neumann also used the word "elephant" as a synonym for linearities and equilibrium points: elephants, equilibria, and linear systems are all equally rare in nature, thus statements about them are nontrivial and the corresponding theories meaningful. Statements and theories about non-elephants in general (non-equilibriums and non-linearities) are inevitably too broad to be of any practical use.

== See also ==
- Epicycloid
- Curve fitting
