= James Booth (mathematician) =

Irish cleric, mathematician and educationist (1806–1878)

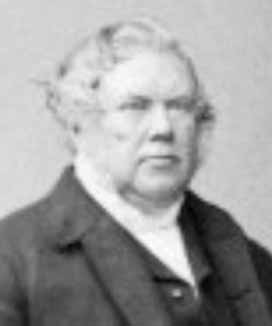
James Booth

The Revd Dr James Booth, JP, FRS (1806–1878) was an Anglo-Irish clergyman, notable as a mathematician and educationalist.

== Life ==
Born at Lavagh, County Leitrim on 26 August 1806, the son of John Booth (cousin to the Gore-Booth baronets), he entered Trinity College, Dublin in 1825 and was elected scholar in 1829, graduating B.A. in 1832, M.A. in 1840, and LL.D. in 1842.

Booth left Ireland in 1840 to become Principal of Bristol College, where he had Francis William Newman and William Benjamin Carpenter as colleagues. It had been set up by the British Institution in 1830, to provide non-denominational education. It closed in 1841, however, having suffered some opposition from James Henry Monk. Booth then set up a short-lived private school, where Edward Fry was a pupil. In 1843 he was appointed vice-principal of the Liverpool Collegiate Institution; he had been ordained at Bristol in 1842, and acted there as curate till he moved.

In 1848 he gave up his Liverpool post, and moved to London. He taught geography and astronomy at Bedford College, London in 1849 and 1850. In 1854 he was appointed minister of St. Anne's, Wandsworth, and in 1859 was presented to the vicarage of Stone, Buckinghamshire, by the Royal Astronomical Society, to which the advowson had been given in 1844 by Dr Lee. He was also chaplain to the Marquess of Lansdowne, and a Justice of the Peace for Buckinghamshire.

Booth was elected Fellow of the Royal Society in 1846, and Fellow of the Royal Astronomical Society in 1859. He was President of the Liverpool Literary and Philosophical Society from 1846 to 1849. In 1852 he joined the Society of Arts, and at his suggestion its weekly Journal of the society was begun. He was treasurer and chairman of the council of the society from 1855 to 1857. He was central in the organisation of the Society of Arts examinations, a system later developed by Harry Chester.

Dr Booth died at his vicarage at Stone, 15 April 1878, aged 71 years.

== Works ==
Booth wrote mathematical papers, and his earliest publication seems to have been a tract On the Application of a New Analytic Method to the Theory of Curves and Curved Surfaces, published at Dublin in 1840. Titles of 29 works were given in the Royal Society Catalogue of Scientific Papers. They were republished, with additions, as A Treatise on Some New Geometrical Methods. The first volume, relating mainly to tangential coordinates and reciprocal polars, was issued in 1873; the second, containing papers on elliptic integrals and one on conic sections, came out in 1877. Booth was the independent inventor of the tangential coordinates that became known as "Boothian co-ordinates", which, however, were previously introduced by Julius Plücker in 1830 in a paper in Crelle's Journal. The lemniscate of Booth, a figure-eight shaped curve, and the oval of Booth, another curve with a similar defining equation, are named after Booth, who studied them both.

In 1846 Booth published a paper on Education and Educational Institutions considered with reference to the Industrial Professions and the Present Aspect of Society (Liverpool, pp. 108), and in the following year Examination the Province of the State, or the Outlines of a Practical System for the Extension of National Education. Addresses which he delivered were published by the Society of Arts: How to Learn and What to Learn; two lectures advocating the system of examinations established by the Society of Arts (1856); and Systematic Instruction and Periodical Examination (1857). He was also instrumental in preparing the reports on Middle Class Education, issued in 1857 by the society, and in that year he annotated and edited for them Speeches and Addresses of His Royal Highness the Prince Albert. He published also:

- On the Female Education of the Industrial Classes (1855);
- On the Self-Improvement of the Working Classes (1858).
- The Bible and its Interpreters, three sermons (1861);
- A Sermon on the Death of Admiral W. H. Smyth, D.C.L., F.R.S. (1865);
- The Lord's Supper, a Feast after Sacrifice (1870).

== Family ==
Dr Booth's wife, Mary, daughter of Daniel Watney of Wandsworth, died in 1874.

== Notes ==
Attribution

This article incorporates text from a publication now in the public domain: Stephen, Leslie, ed. (1886). "Booth, James (1806-1878)". Dictionary of National Biography. Vol. 5. London: Smith, Elder & Co.
