= Syntractrix =

A syntractrix is a curve of the form

$x+\sqrt{b^2-y^2}= a \ln \frac{b+\sqrt{b^2-y^2}}{y}.$

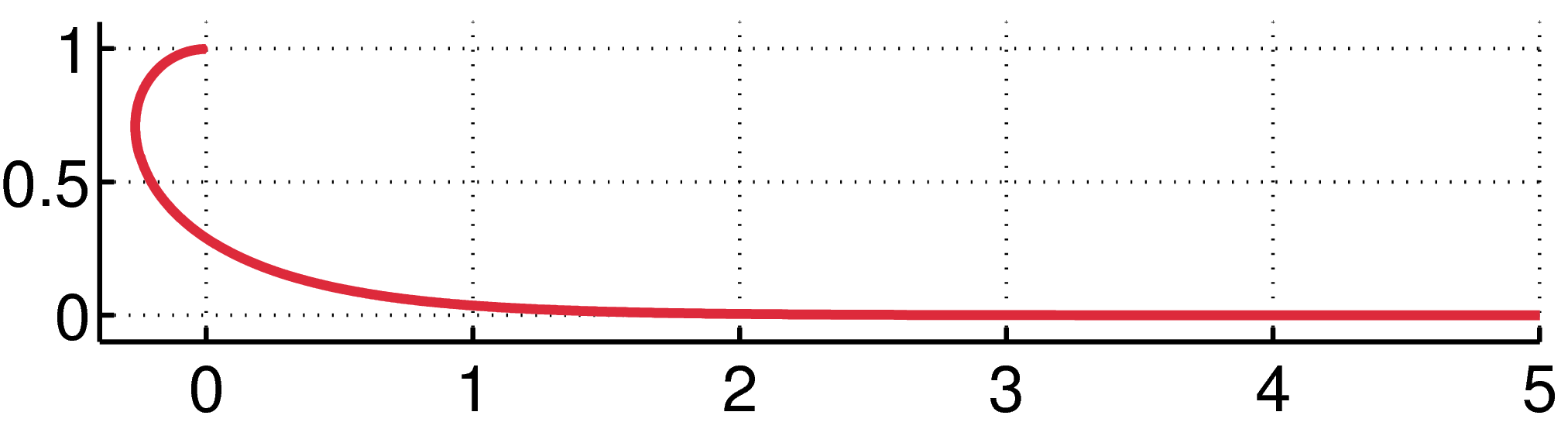
The syntractrix for $a=0.5$ and $b=1.$

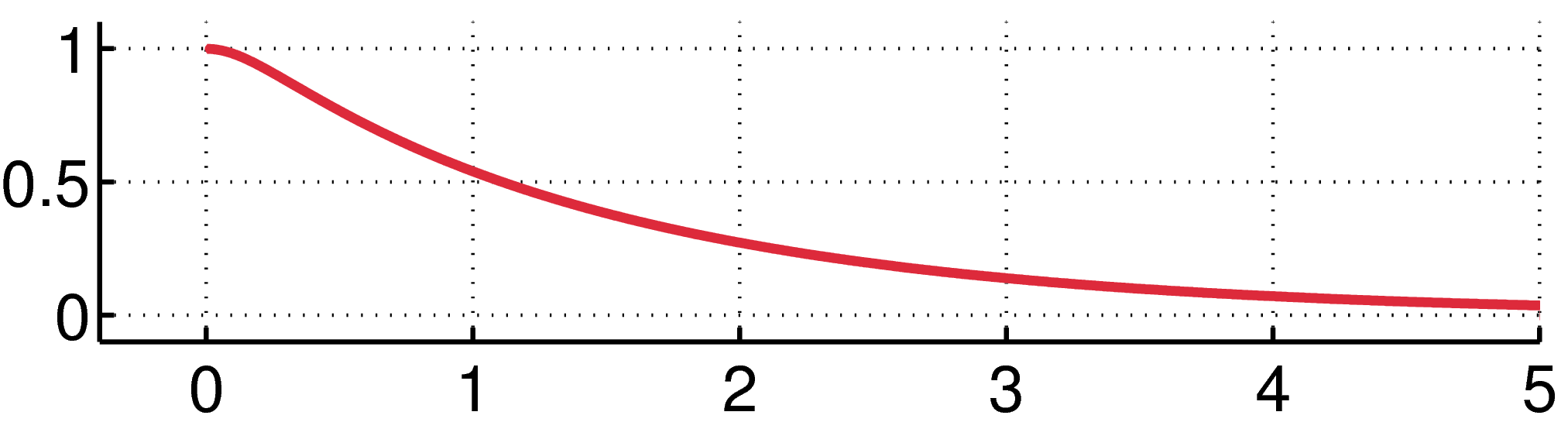
The syntractrix for $a=1.5$ and $b=1.$

It is the locus of a point on the tangent of a tractrix at a constant distance from the point of tangency, as the point of tangency is moved along the curve.
