= Butterfly curve (transcendental) =

Transcendental plane curve

The butterfly curve with animated construction gives an idea of the complexity of the curve.

The butterfly curve is a transcendental plane curve discovered by Temple H. Fay of University of Southern Mississippi in 1989.

== Equation ==
For $0 \le t \le 12\pi$, the curve is given by the following parametric equations:
$$\begin{align}
x &= \sin t \!\left(e^{\cos t} - 2\cos 4t - \sin^5 \left(\frac{t}{12}\right)\right) \\
y &= \cos t \!\left(e^{\cos t} - 2\cos 4t - \sin^5 \left(\frac{t}{12}\right)\right)
\end{align}$$
or by the following polar equation:
$$r = e^{\sin\theta} - 2\cos \left(4\theta\right) + \sin^5\left(\frac{2\theta - \pi}{24}\right).$$

The sin term has been added for purely aesthetic reasons, to make the butterfly appear fuller and more pleasing to the eye.

== Developments ==
In 2006, two mathematicians using Mathematica analyzed the function and found variants where leaves, flowers, or other insects became apparent. New developments regarding such curves are still under research by mathematicians.
