= Ampersand curve =

Type of quartic plane curve

The ampersand curve on the Cartesian plane.

In geometry, the ampersand curve is a type of quartic plane curve. It was named after its resemblance to the ampersand symbol by Henry Cundy and Arthur Rollett.

The ampersand curve is the graph of the equation

$$6x^4+4y^4-21x^3+6x^2y^2+19x^2-11xy^2-3y^2=0.$$

The graph of the ampersand curve has three crunode points where it intersects itself at (0,0), (1,1), and (1,−1). The curve has a genus of 0.

The curve was originally constructed by Julius Plücker as a quartic plane curve that has 28 real bitangents, the maximum possible for bitangents of a quartic.

It is the special case of the Plücker quartic

$$(x+y)(y-x)(x-1)\left(x-\tfrac{3}{2}\right)-2\left(y^2+x(x-2)\right)^2-k=0,$$

with k = 0.

The curve has six real horizontal tangents at

$$\left(\frac{1}{2}, \pm\frac{\sqrt{5}}{2}\right), \qquad \left(\frac{159-\sqrt{201}}{120}, \pm\frac{\sqrt{1389+67\sqrt\frac{67}{3}}}{40}\right), \qquad \left(\frac{159+\sqrt{201}}{120}, \pm\frac{\sqrt{1389-67\sqrt\frac{67}{3}}}{40}\right),$$

and four real vertical tangents at

$$\left(-\frac{1}{10},\pm\frac{\sqrt{23}}{10}\right), \qquad \left(\frac{3}{2},\frac{\sqrt{3}}{2}\right).$$

It is an example of a curve that has no value of x in its domain with only one y value.
