= Devil's curve =

Algebraic plane curve

Devil's curve for a = 0.8 and b = 1.

Devil's curve with $a$ ranging from 0 to 1 and b = 1 (with the curve colour going from blue to red).

In geometry, a Devil's curve, also known as the Devil on Two Sticks, is a curve defined in the Cartesian plane by an equation of the form

$$y^4 - b^2y^2 = x^4 - a^2x^2$$
i.e. a Quartic, in terms of x and y.

The polar equation of this curve is of the form

$$r = \sqrt{\frac{b^2 \sin^2\theta-a^2 \cos^2\theta}{\sin^2\theta-\cos^2\theta}} = \sqrt{\frac{b^2 -a^2 \cot^2\theta}{1-\cot^2\theta}}$$

Devil's curves were discovered in 1750 by Gabriel Cramer, who studied them extensively.

The name comes from the shape its central lemniscate takes when graphed. The shape is named after the juggling game diabolo, which was named after the Devil and which involves two sticks, a string, and a spinning prop in the likeness of the lemniscate.

For $|b|>|a|$, the central lemniscate, often called hour-glass, is horizontal, For $|b|<|a|$ it is vertical. If $|b|=|a|$, the shape becomes a circle. The vertical hour-glass intersects the y-axis at $-b,0,b$ . The horizontal hour-glass intersects the x-axis at $-a,0,a$ and for the four turning points, for this hour-glass,
$$\frac{dy}{dx}=\frac{x(a^2-2x^2)}{y(b^2-2y^2)}=0$$
giving:
$$x=+/- \frac{\sqrt2}{2}a$$

Total Area of horizontal hour-glass
$$\approx 2.8284\int_{0}^{a}\sqrt{b^2-\sqrt{-4a^2x^2+b^4+4x^4}}\,dx$$

== Electric Motor Curve ==
A special case of the Devil's curve occurs at $\frac{a^2}{b^2}=\frac{25}{24}$, where the curve is called the electric motor curve. It is defined by an equation of the form

$$y^2(y^2-96) = x^2(x^2-100)$$

The name of the special case comes from the middle shape's resemblance to the coils of wire, which rotate from forces exerted by magnets surrounding it.
