= Glissette =

Curve traced by another curve that slides along two fixed curves

In geometry, a glissette is a curve determined by either the locus of any point, or the envelope of any line or curve, that is attached to a curve that slides against or along two other fixed curves.

== Examples ==
=== Ellipse ===
A basic example is that of a line segment of which the endpoints slide along two perpendicular lines. The glissette of any point on the line forms an ellipse.

=== Astroid ===
Similarly, the envelope glissette of the line segment in the example above is an astroid.

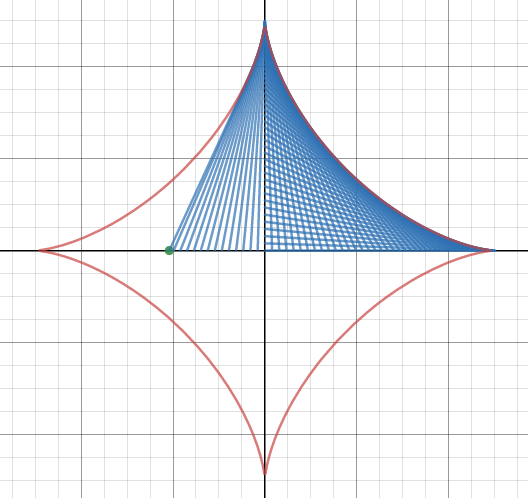

=== Conchoid ===
Any conchoid may be regarded as a glissette, with a line and one of its points sliding along a given line and fixed point.
