= Fish curve =

The fish curve with scale parameter a = 1

A fish curve is an ellipse negative pedal curve that is shaped like a fish. In a fish curve, the pedal point is at the focus for the special case of the squared eccentricity $e^2=\tfrac{1}{2}$. The parametric equations for a fish curve correspond to those of the associated ellipse.

== Equations ==
For an ellipse with the parametric equations
$$\textstyle {x=a\cos(t), \qquad y=\frac {a\sin(t)}{\sqrt {2}}},$$
the corresponding fish curve has parametric equations
$$\textstyle {x=a\cos(t)-\frac {a\sin^2 (t)}{\sqrt 2}, \qquad y=a\cos(t)\sin(t)}.$$

When the origin is translated to the node (the crossing point), the Cartesian equation can be written as:
$$\left(2x^2+y^2\right)^2-2 \sqrt {2} ax\left(2x^2-3y^2\right)+2a^2\left(y^2-x^2\right)=0.$$

== Properties ==
=== Area ===
The area of a fish curve is given by:
$$\begin{align}
A &= \frac {1}{2}\left|\int{\left(xy'-yx'\right)dt}\right| \\
&= \frac {1}{8}a^2\left|\int{\left[3\cos(t)+\cos(3t)+2\sqrt {2}\sin^2(t)\right]dt}\right|,
\end{align}$$
so the area of the tail and head are given by:
$$\begin{align}
A_{\text{Tail}} &= \left(\frac {2}{3}-\frac {\pi}{4\sqrt {2}}\right)a^2, \\
A_{\text{Head}} &= \left(\frac {2}{3}+\frac {\pi}{4\sqrt {2}}\right)a^2,
\end{align}$$
giving the overall area for the fish as:
$$A = \frac {4}{3}a^2.$$

=== Curvature, arc length, and tangential angle ===
The arc length of the curve is given by
$$a\sqrt {2}\left(\frac {1}{2}\pi+3\right).$$

The curvature of a fish curve is given by:
$$K(t) = \frac {2\sqrt {2}+3\cos(t)-\cos(3t)}{2a\left[\cos^4 t+\sin^2 t+\sin^4 t+\sqrt {2}\sin(t)\sin(2t)\right]^\frac {3}{2}},$$
and the tangential angle is given by:
$$\phi(t)=\pi-\arg\left(\sqrt {2}-1-\frac {2}{\left(1+\sqrt {2}\right)e^{it} -1}\right),$$
where $\arg(z)$ is the complex argument.
