= Complex projective plane =

2-dimensional complex projective space

In mathematics, the complex projective plane, usually denoted $\mathbb{P}^2(\C)$ or $\mathbb{CP}^2,$ is the two-dimensional complex projective space. It is a complex manifold of complex dimension 2, described by three complex coordinates

$$(Z_1,Z_2,Z_3) \in \C^3, \qquad (Z_1,Z_2,Z_3)\neq (0,0,0)$$

where, however, the triples differing by an overall rescaling are identified:

$$(Z_1,Z_2,Z_3) \equiv (\lambda Z_1,\lambda Z_2, \lambda Z_3); \quad \lambda \in \C, \qquad \lambda \neq 0.$$

That is, these are homogeneous coordinates in the traditional sense of projective geometry.

== Topology ==
The Betti numbers of the complex projective plane are

1, 0, 1, 0, 1, 0, 0, .....

The middle dimension 2 is accounted for by the homology class of the complex projective line, or Riemann sphere, lying in the plane. The nontrivial homotopy groups of the complex projective plane are $\pi_2=\pi_5=\mathbb{Z}$. The fundamental group is trivial and all other higher homotopy groups are those of the 5-sphere, i.e. torsion.

== Algebraic geometry ==
In birational geometry, a complex rational surface is any algebraic surface birationally equivalent to the complex projective plane. It is known that any non-singular rational variety is obtained from the plane by a sequence of blowing up transformations and their inverses ('blowing down') of curves, which must be of a very particular type. As a special case, a non-singular complex quadric in $\mathbb P^3$ is obtained from the plane by blowing up two points to curves, and then blowing down the line through these two points; the inverse of this transformation can be seen by taking a point P on the quadric Q, blowing it up, and projecting onto a general plane in $\mathbb P^3$ by drawing lines through P.

The group of birational automorphisms of the complex projective plane is the Cremona group.

== Differential geometry ==
As a Riemannian manifold, the complex projective plane is a 4-dimensional manifold whose sectional curvature is quarter-pinched, but not strictly so. That is, it attains both bounds and thus evades being a sphere, as the sphere theorem would otherwise require. The rival normalisations are for the curvature to be pinched between 1/4 and 1; alternatively, between 1 and 4. With respect to the former normalisation, the imbedded surface defined by the complex projective line has Gaussian curvature 1. With respect to the latter normalisation, the imbedded real projective plane has Gaussian curvature 1.

An explicit demonstration of the Riemann and Ricci tensors is given in the n=2 subsection of the article on the Fubini-Study metric.

== See also ==
- Circular points at infinity
- del Pezzo surface
- Toric geometry
- Fake projective plane
