= Butterfly curve (algebraic) =

Algebraic plane curve

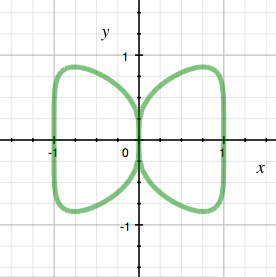
The butterfly curve $x^6 + y^6 = x^2$

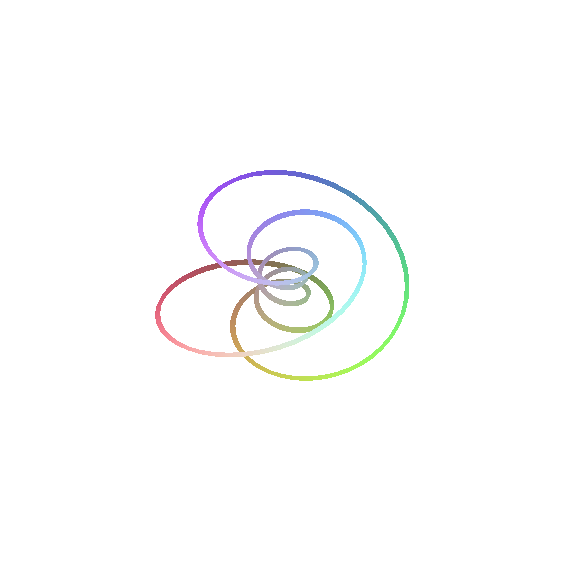
The butterfly curve singularity link

In mathematics, the algebraic butterfly curve is a plane algebraic curve of degree six given by the equation

$$x^6 + y^6 = x^2.$$

The butterfly curve has a single singularity with delta invariant three, which means it is a curve of genus seven. The only plane curves of genus seven are singular, since seven is not a triangular number, and the minimum degree for such a curve is six.

The butterfly curve has branching number and multiplicity two, and hence the singularity link has two components.

The area of the algebraic butterfly curve is given by

$$4 \int_0^1 (x^2 - x^6)^{\frac{1}{6}} dx = \frac{ \Gamma\big(\frac{1}{6}\big) \cdot \Gamma\big(\frac{1}{3}\big)}{3 \sqrt{\pi}} \approx 2.804,$$

where $\Gamma$ is the gamma function, and the arc length of the curve is $s \approx 9.017$.
