= Lemniscate of Gerono =

Plane algebraic curve

The lemniscate of Gerono

In algebraic geometry, the lemniscate of Gerono, or lemniscate of Huygens, or figure-eight curve, is a plane algebraic curve of degree four and genus zero and is a lemniscate curve shaped like an $\infty$ symbol, or figure eight. It has equation

$$x^4-x^2+y^2 = 0.$$

It was studied by Camille-Christophe Gerono.

== Parameterization ==
Because the curve is of genus zero, it can be parametrized by rational functions; one means of doing that is

$$x = \frac{t^2-1}{t^2+1},\ y = \frac{2t(t^2-1)}{(t^2+1)^2}.$$

Another representation is

$$x = \cos \varphi,\ y = \sin\varphi\,\cos\varphi = \sin(2\varphi)/2$$

which reveals that this lemniscate is a special case of a Lissajous figure.

== Dual curve ==
The dual curve (see Plücker formula), pictured below, has therefore a somewhat different character. Its equation is

$$(x^2-y^2)^3 + 8y^4+20x^2y^2-x^4-16y^2=0.$$

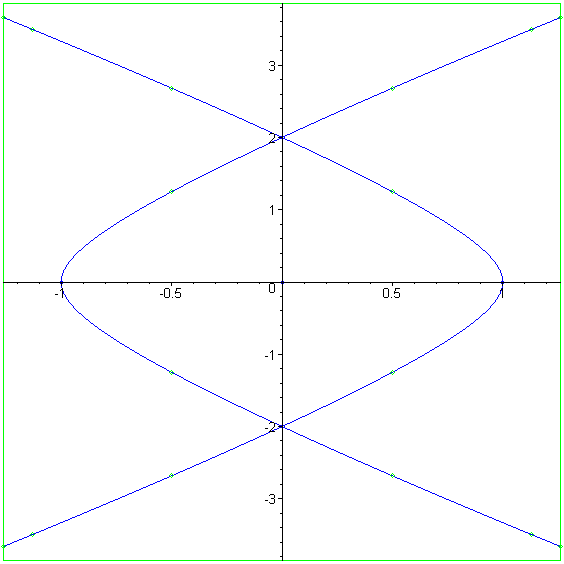
Dual to the lemniscate of Gerono
