= Plane curve =

Mathematical concept

In mathematics, a plane curve is a curve in a plane that may be a Euclidean plane, an affine plane or a projective plane. The most frequently studied cases are smooth plane curves (including piecewise smooth plane curves), and algebraic plane curves. Plane curves also include the Jordan curves (curves that enclose a region of the plane but need not be smooth) and the graphs of continuous functions.

== Symbolic representation ==
A plane curve can often be represented in Cartesian coordinates by an implicit equation of the form $f(x,y)=0$ for some specific function f. If this equation can be solved explicitly for y or x – that is, rewritten as $y=g(x)$ or $x=h(y)$ for specific function g or h – then this provides an alternative, explicit, form of the representation. A plane curve can also often be represented in Cartesian coordinates by a parametric equation of the form $(x,y)=(x(t), y(t))$ for specific functions $x(t)$ and $y(t).$

Plane curves can sometimes also be represented in alternative coordinate systems, such as polar coordinates that express the location of each point in terms of an angle and a distance from the origin.

== Smooth plane curve ==
A smooth plane curve is a curve in a real Euclidean plane $\R^2$ and is a one-dimensional smooth manifold. This means that a smooth plane curve is a plane curve which "locally looks like a line", in the sense that near every point, it may be mapped to a line by a smooth function. Equivalently, a smooth plane curve can be given locally by an equation $f(x, y) = 0,$ where $f: \R^2 \to \R$ is a smooth function, and the partial derivatives $\partial f/\partial x$ and $\partial f/\partial y$ are never both 0 at a point of the curve.

== Algebraic plane curve ==
An algebraic plane curve is a curve in an affine or projective plane given by one polynomial equation $f(x,y) = 0$ (or $F(x,y,z) = 0,$ where F is a homogeneous polynomial, in the projective case.)

Algebraic curves have been studied extensively since the 18th century.

Every algebraic plane curve has a degree, the degree of the defining equation, which is equal, in case of an algebraically closed field, to the number of intersections of the curve with a line in general position. For example, the circle given by the equation $x^2 + y^2 = 1$ has degree 2.

The non-singular plane algebraic curves of degree 2 are called conic sections, and their projective completion are all isomorphic to the projective completion of the circle $x^2 + y^2 = 1$ (that is the projective curve of equation $x^2 + y^2 - z^2 = 0$). The plane curves of degree 3 are called cubic plane curves and, if they are non-singular, elliptic curves. Those of degree 4 are called quartic plane curves.

== Examples ==
Numerous examples of plane curves are shown in Gallery of curves and listed at List of curves. The algebraic curves of degree 1 or 2 are shown here (an algebraic curve of degree less than 3 is always contained in a plane):

| Name | Implicit equation | Parametric equation | As a function | graph |
|---|---|---|---|---|
| Straight line | $a x+b y=c$ | $(x,y)=(x_0 + \alpha t,y_0+\beta t)$ | $y=m x+c$ | |
| Circle | $x^2+y^2=r^2$ | $(x,y)=(r \cos t, r \sin t)$ | | framless |
| Parabola | $y-x^2=0$ | $(x,y)=(t,t^2)$ | $y=x^2$ | |
| Ellipse | $\frac{x^2}{a^2} + \frac{y^2}{b^2} = 1$ | $(x,y)=(a \cos t, b \sin t)$ | | framless |
| Hyperbola | $\frac{x^2}{a^2} - \frac{y^2}{b^2} = 1$ | $(x,y)=(a \cosh t, b \sinh t)$ | | |

== See also ==
- Algebraic geometry
- Convex curve
- Differential geometry
- Osgood curve
- Plane curve fitting
- Projective varieties
- Skew curve
