= Lemniscate of Bernoulli =

Plane algebraic curve

A lemniscate of Bernoulli and its two foci F_{1} and F_{2}

The lemniscate of Bernoulli is the pedal curve of a rectangular hyperbola

Sinusoidal spirals (r^{n} = −1^{n} cos(nθ), θ = π/2) in polar coordinates and their equivalents in rectangular coordinates: n = −2: Equilateral hyperbola n = −1: Line n = −1/2: Parabola n = 1/2: Cardioid n = 1: Circle n = 2: Lemniscate of Bernoulli

In geometry, the lemniscate of Bernoulli is a plane curve whose shape resembles the numeral 8 or the ∞ symbol. It can be defined from two given points $F_1$ and $F_2$, called the foci, as the locus of points $P$ satisfying the relation $|PF_1|\cdot|PF_2| = c^2,$ where the notation $|AB|$ means the distance between two points $A$ and $B$, and $c = \tfrac12|F_1F_2|$ is half the distance between foci. The name lemniscate derives from the Latin word lemniscatus, meaning "decorated with hanging ribbons". The lemniscate of Bernoulli is a special case of the Cassini oval and is a rational algebraic curve of degree four.

The curve was first studied in 1694 by Jakob Bernoulli, who introduced it as a modification of an ellipse. An ellipse is defined as the locus of points for which the sum of the distances to two fixed focal points is constant, whereas a Cassini oval is defined as the locus of points for which the product of these distances is constant. The lemniscate of Bernoulli is the special case of a Cassini oval which passes through the midpoint between its foci.

The lemniscate of Bernoulli results from applying a circle inversion transformation to a hyperbola, where the center of inversion is the midpoint of the hyperbola's foci. It can also be drawn mechanically using a mechanical linkage known as Watt's linkage, provided that the lengths of the three bars and the distance between the fixed endpoints are chosen to form an crossed parallelogram.

== Equations ==
The lemniscate of Bernoulli may be described using either the focal parameter $c$ or the half-width $a$. These parameters are related by $a = c\sqrt{2}$.

- In Cartesian coordinates (up to translation and rotation):
  $$\begin{align}
\left(x^2 + y^2\right)^2 &= a^2\left(x^2 - y^2\right) \\
&= 2c^2\left(x^2 - y^2\right)
\end{align}$$
- Solved for $\textstyle y^2$ as a function of $x$:
  $$y^2 = \left(\sqrt{8x^2 + a^2} - a\right)\frac{a}{2} - x^2$$
- As a parametric equation:
  $$x = \frac{a\cos t}{1 + \sin^2 t}, \qquad y = \frac{a\sin t\cos t}{1 + \sin^2 t}$$
- A rational parametrization:
  $$x = a\frac{t + t^3}{1 + t^4}, \qquad y = a\frac{t - t^3}{1 + t^4}$$
- In polar coordinates:
  $$r^2 = a^2\cos 2\theta$$
- In the complex plane:
  $$|z - c|\cdot|z + c| = c^2$$
- In two-center bipolar coordinates:
  $$rr' = c^2$$

== Arc length and elliptic functions ==
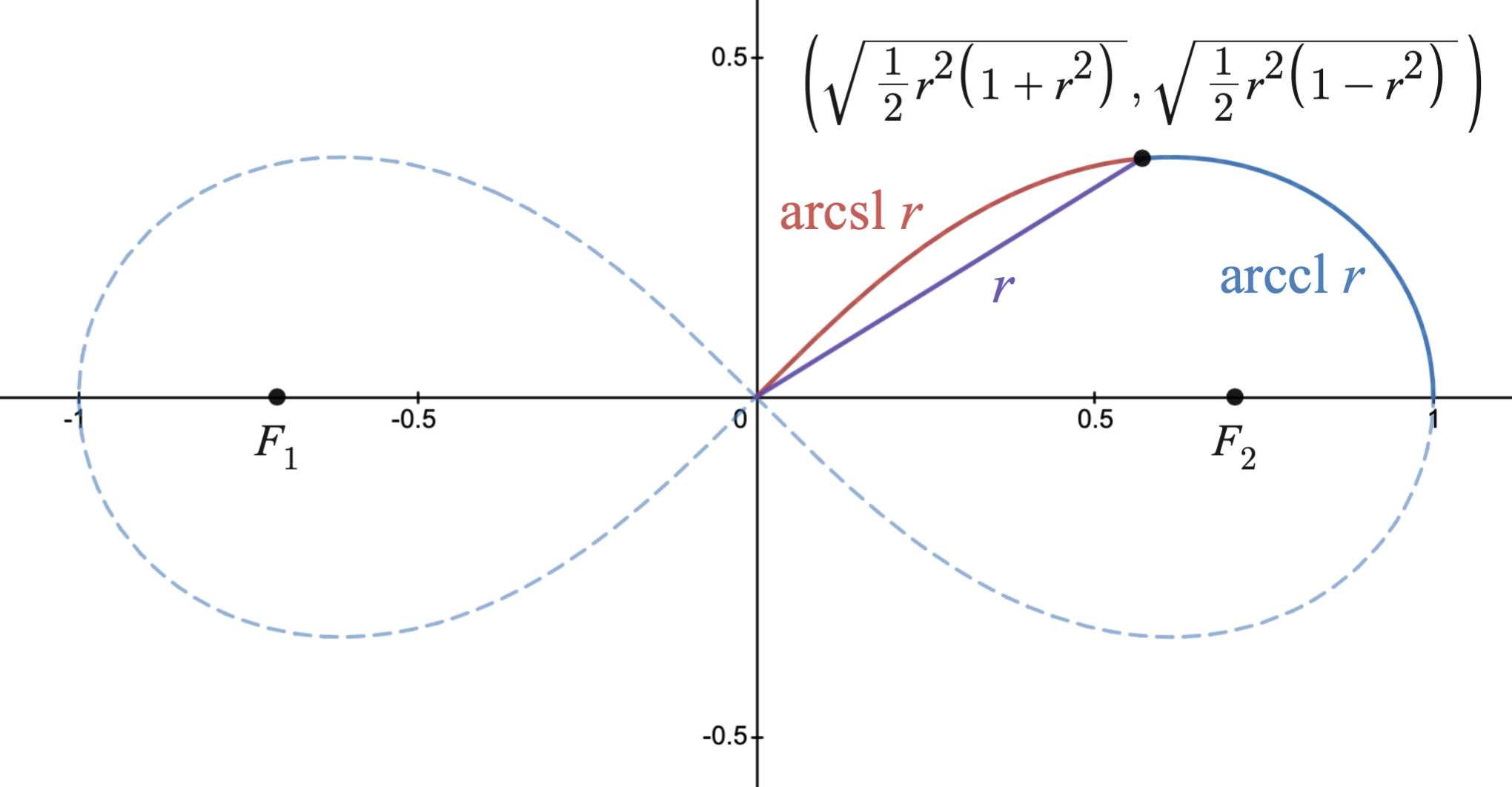
The lemniscate sine and cosine relate the arc length of an arc of the lemniscate to the distance of one endpoint from the origin.

The determination of the arc length of arcs of the lemniscate leads to elliptic integrals, as was discovered in the eighteenth century. Around 1800, the elliptic functions inverting those integrals were studied by C. F. Gauss (largely unpublished at the time, but allusions in the notes to his Disquisitiones Arithmeticae). The period lattices are of a very special form, being proportional to the Gaussian integers. For this reason the case of elliptic functions with complex multiplication by $\sqrt{-1}$ is called the lemniscatic case in some sources.

Using the elliptic integral
$$\operatorname{arcsl}x \stackrel{\text{def}}{{}={}} \int_0^x\frac{dt}{\sqrt{1-t^4}}$$
the formula of the arc length L can be given as
$$\begin{align} L &= 4a \int_{0}^1\frac{dt}{\sqrt{1-t^4}} = 4a\,\operatorname{arcsl}1 = 2\varpi a \\[6pt] &= \frac{\Gamma (1/4)^2}{\sqrt\pi}\,c =\frac{2\pi}{\operatorname{M}(1,1/\sqrt{2})}c\approx 7{.}416 \cdot c \end{align}$$
where $c$ and $a = \sqrt{2}c$ are defined as above, $\varpi = 2 \operatorname{arcsl}{1}$ is the lemniscate constant, $\Gamma$ is the gamma function and $\operatorname{M}$ is the arithmetic–geometric mean.

== Angles ==
Given two distinct points $\rm A$ and $\rm B$, let $\rm M$ be the midpoint of $\rm AB$. Then the lemniscate of diameter $\rm AB$ can also be defined as the set of points $\rm A$, $\rm B$, $\rm M$, together with the locus of the points $\rm P$ such that $\left|\widehat{\rm APM}-\widehat{\rm BPM} \right|$ is a right angle (cf. Thales' theorem and its converse).

relation between angles at Bernoulli's lemniscate

The following theorem about angles occurring in the lemniscate is due to German mathematician Gerhard Christoph Hermann Vechtmann, who described it 1843 in his dissertation on lemniscates.

F_{1} and F_{2} are the foci of the lemniscate, O is the midpoint of the line segment F_{1}F_{2} and P is any point on the lemniscate outside the line connecting F_{1} and F_{2}. The normal n of the lemniscate in P intersects the line connecting F_{1} and F_{2} in R. Now the interior angle of the triangle OPR at O is one third of the triangle's exterior angle at R (see also angle trisection). In addition the interior angle at P is twice the interior angle at O.

== Further properties ==
The inversion of hyperbola yields a lemniscate

- The lemniscate is symmetric to the line connecting its foci F_{1} and F_{2} and as well to the perpendicular bisector of the line segment F_{1}F_{2}.
- The lemniscate is symmetric to the midpoint of the line segment F_{1}F_{2}.
- The area enclosed by the lemniscate is a^{2} = 2c^{2}.
- The lemniscate is the circle inversion of a hyperbola and vice versa.
- The two tangents at the midpoint O are perpendicular, and each of them forms an angle of π/4 with the line connecting F_{1} and F_{2}.
- The planar cross-section of a standard torus tangent to its inner equator is a lemniscate.
- The curvature at $(x,y)$ is ${3\over a^2}\sqrt{x^2+y^2}$. The maximum curvature, which occurs at $(\pm a,0)$, is therefore $3/a$.

== See also ==
- Lemniscate of Booth
- Lemniscate of Gerono
- Lemniscate constant
- Lemniscatic elliptic function
- Cassini oval
