= Tschirnhausen cubic =

Cubic plane curve

Tschirnhausen cubic, case of a = 1

In mathematics, the Tschirnhausen cubic is a cubic plane curve defined in Cartesian coordinates $(x,y)$ by the cubic equation
$$27ay^2 = (a-x)(8a+x)^2,$$
or in polar coordinates $(r,\theta)$ by the equivalent trigonometric equation involving the secant function,
$$r = a\sec^3 \frac{\theta}{3}.$$

It is a nodal cubic, meaning that it crosses itself at one point, its node. The angle at this crossing point, inside the loop formed by the crossing, is 60°. Because the Tschirnhausen cubic has this singularity, it can be given a parametric equation, expressing both of its Cartesian coordinates as polynomial functions of a single parameter, and any arc of it can be drawn as a cubic Bézier curve. It is a special case of a sinusoidal spiral, of a pursuit curve, and of a Pythagorean hodograph curve.

The original study of this curve, by Ehrenfried von Tschirnhaus, found it as a caustic, the bright curve formed by light reflected in a parabolic mirror. It was used by Eugène Catalan in an angle trisection, and it appears among the geodesics of the Enneper surface.

== History ==
The curve was studied by Ehrenfried von Tschirnhaus, Guillaume de l'Hôpital, Pierre Bouguer, and Eugène Catalan. It was given the name Tschirnhausen cubic in a 1900 paper by Raymond Clare Archibald, though it is sometimes known as de L'Hôpital's cubic or the trisectrix of Catalan.

Tschirnhaus wrote about this curve in a 1690 publication in Acta Eruditorum, concerned with geometrical optics. He showed that it arises as the caustic of parallel light rays (light rays from a source infinitely far away) reflected from a parabolic mirror. L'Hôpital included it in an 1696 textbook on calculus, Analyse des infiniment petits, pour l’intelligence des lignes courbes.

Bouguer included this curve in a 1732 study of pursuit curves. He observed that for a pursuer moving twice as fast as their linearly-moving target and always moving directly towards the target rather than anticipating their movement (intuitively, like a dog chasing its master on a walk), the curve resulting from this motion is cubic.

Much later, Catalan used this curve, and a parabola associated with it, as part of an angle trisection. Catalan published this work in a letter in 1885, but writes that he originally derived it in 1832, in a paper that by 1885 was "yellowed by age". As Catalan observed, and used in this construction, the Tschirnhausen cubic is the negative pedal curve of a parabola, with respect to the focus of the parabola.

== Equations and construction ==
The Tschirnhausen cubic has the equation in polar coordinates
$$r = a\sec^3 \frac{\theta}{3},$$
where $(r,\theta)$ are the polar coordinates of a point on the curve, $a$ is an arbitrary scale parameter, and $\sec$ is the secant function.

Define another parameter $t$ by $t=\tan(\theta/3)$. Then converting the curve from polar coordinates to Cartesian coordinates and applying De Moivre's triple-angle formulas leads to a parametric equation for the curve, giving its $x$ and $y$ coordinates as functions of the parameter $t$:
$$\begin{align}
x&= a(1 - 3t^2) \\
y&= at(3-t^2).
\end{align}$$
Eliminating the parameter $t$ gives an expression involving only the coordinates $x$ and $y$ and the scale parameter $a$. This expression as an equation of cubic polynomials demonstrates that the Tschirnhausen cubic is an algebraic curve, a cubic plane curve:
$$27ay^2 = (a-x)(8a+x)^2.$$

Another way of parameterizing the same curve uses complex numbers, each representing a point in the complex plane. For a parameter $\tau$ ranging over the unit circle in the complex plane, the Tschirnhausen cubic can be described as the set of complex numbers $z$ determined by the parametric equation
$$z=\frac2{(1-\tau)^3}.$$

The Tschirnhausen cubic can also be constructed synthetically, as the negative pedal curve of the parabola with respect to its focus. For any curve $C$ and fixed point $P$, the negative pedal curve is the envelope of a family of lines, through points $Q$ on curve $C$, perpendicular to the lines $PQ$. For a curve to be the envelope of a given family of lines, the curve must have the lines in the given family as its tangent lines. The reverse construction, the pedal curve, finds the locus of points closest to $P$ on each tangent line; the pedal curve of the Tschirnhausen cubic, for $P$ at the origin of the polar coordinate system, is a parabola. In the same way, the parabola is the negative pedal curve of a line, with respect to a point off the line (the focus of the parabola), and the pedal curve of a parabola with respect to its focus is a line. A line can in turn be seen as the negative pedal curve of a single point, and the pedal curve of a line degenerates to a point. Therefore, the Tschirnhausen cubic is the three-times-iterated negative pedal curve of a point.

== Applications ==
=== Caustic ===
Similar copies of the Tschirnhausen cubic created as caustics for varying directions of parallel light rays, reflected from a parabola

The reflected light rays (purple) for incoming light rays parallel to the black line

Geometrical optics models light by rays (rather than, as in other forms of optics, particles or waves), emitted by a source of light and then transformed through reflections and refractions. When modeled in this way, caustics, arcs or sheets of intensified light created by reflection or refraction through curved surfaces, can be explained mathematically as the envelopes of the reflected or refracted light rays.

Light from an infinitely far source (or from a source so far as to be indistinguishable from infinite, such as the stars) forms a parallel family of rays. When these rays are reflected by a parabolic mirror, whose symmetry axis is parallel to the rays, they converge at the focus point of the parabola, which may be thought of as a degenerate caustic. For any other direction of parallel rays, their reflections from the same mirror do not focus at a point, but instead form a non-degenerate caustic. This caustic (in its two-dimensional cross-section) takes the shape of a Tschirnhausen cubic, of varying scale and direction depending on the direction of the incoming rays. Its scale is largest for rays perpendicular to the symmetry axis of the parabolic mirror, and smallest for rays whose direction approaches that of the symmetry axis.

The Tschirnhausen cubic can also be found in a second way as a caustic, for reflection from a semicubical parabola of parallel light rays that are perpendicular to the shared symmetry axis of the semicubical parabola and the Tschirnhausen cubic.

=== Pursuit curve ===
The Tschirnhausen cubic is a special case of a radiodrome. This is a type of pursuit curve, the curve followed by a pursuer moving towards a moving target. For a radiodrome, the target moves in a straight line at constant speed, and the pursuer moves directly towards the current position of the target, rather than anticipating the target's motion. This kind of curve is sometimes called a dog curve, by analogy with a dog running after its master on a walk. The shape of a radiodrome depends on how fast the pursuer moves; the Tschirnhausen cubic is the radiodrome for a pursuer that moves twice as fast as the target. Whenever the pursuer is faster than the target, the pursuit ends with both pursuer and target reaching the same point, the point of capture, at the same time as each other, after the pursuer traces an arc of the pursuit curve. The line of the target's motion is a tangent line to the Tschirnhausen cubic at the point of capture. This point is the point at which the Tschirnhausen cubic has its maximum curvature, its vertex.

The same curve can also be generated as a different type of a pursuit curve, in which again a target moves in a straight line at constant speed, while a "crab" sidesteps the target by moving at the same speed, always facing the target and moving sideways. That is, the direction of the crab's motion is perpendicular to the line between the crab and the target. A crab moving in this way traces out the Tschirnhausen cubic.

=== Trisectrix ===
Catalan's angle trisection, redrawn from Catalan 1885 with the same labeling. Angle BFD is one third of angle AFD.

As Catalan observed, the Tschirnhausen cubic can be used as a trisectrix, a curve that can be used to solve the trisection of the angle. Trisection cannot be solved with straightedge and compass, but can be solved when a copy of this curve and its associated parabola are available.

To trisect a given angle, given a copy of the Tschirnhausen cubic and its associated parabola, place the angle at the focus $F$ of the parabola, with one side of the angle along the ray $FA$ from the focus towards the vertex $A$ of the parabola, the point of maximum curvature where it is tangent to the Tschirnhausen cubic. Extend the other side of the angle to cross the Tschirnhausen cubic at point $D$, so that the angle to be trisected is $AFD$. Find a point $B$ on the parabola at which $DBF$ is a right angle (the intersection point of the parabola with a circle having $DF$ as its diameter) and for which line $DB$ is a tangent line to the Tschirnhausen cubic. Then angle $BFD$ is one third of angle $AFD$.

To prove that angle $BFD$ is one third of angle $AFD$, Catalan used the auxiliary points $C$, $E$, and $G$, as labeled in the figure and defined below. By the negative pedal property of the Tschirnhausen cubic, angle $DBF$ is a right angle, forming two sides of a rectangle $DBFC$ with center $G$, whose diagonal $BC$ is perpendicular to the parabola. This defines the points $C$ and $G$. The third auxiliary point $E$ is the crossing point of diagonal $BC$ with the symmetry axis $AF$ of the two curves. Catalan observed that triangles $BFE$ and $BGF$ are two similar isosceles triangles. He lets $\theta$ denote the apex angle of these triangles, $\theta=\angle BGF=\angle BFE$, and he lets $\omega$ denote the angle $\omega=\angle GFE$ that is supplementary to the angle to be trisected, $\pi-\omega$. Then the base angle of the isosceles triangles is $\tfrac12(\pi-\theta)$. Segment $FG$ divides the apex of isosceles triangle $BFE$ into two angles, one equal to this base angle and the other equal to $\omega$, from which it follows that $\theta=\tfrac12(\pi-\theta)+\omega$ and $\omega=\tfrac32\theta-\tfrac12\pi$. Thus, the angle to be trisected, $\angle AFD=\pi-\omega$, is $\tfrac32(\pi-\theta)$, three times the base angle $\angle BFD=\tfrac12(\pi-\theta)$.

=== Spline ===
An arc of a Tschirnhausen cubic, constructed as a cubic Bézier spline (red). The control path of the spline is shown as dotted black lines. The two consecutive triples of points in the control path form two congruent isosceles triangles (blue)

The cubic plane curves that have a singularity, such as the crossing point of the Tschirnhausen cubic, also have cubic parametric equations and representations as cubic Bézier splines. These are curves defined by a control path of four points $\mathbf{p}_0, \mathbf{p}_1, \mathbf{p}_2, \mathbf{p}_3$; the spline is the set of points
$$(1-t)^3\mathbf{p}_0+3(1-t)^2t\mathbf{p}_1+3(1-t)t^2\mathbf{p}_2+t^3\mathbf{p}_3,$$
for a parameter $t$ that ranges from $0$ to $1$. A spline defined in this way starts at $\mathbf{p}_0$ and $t=0$, initially moving directly towards $\mathbf{p}_1$, and it ends at $\mathbf{p}_3$ and $t=1$, moving directly away from $\mathbf{p}_2$. For control paths with the property that the two consecutive triples $\mathbf{p}_0, \mathbf{p}_1, \mathbf{p}_2$ and $\mathbf{p}_1, \mathbf{p}_2, \mathbf{p}_3$ form similar triangles (without reflection and with corresponding vertices in the same order), the resulting spline is an arc of a scaled Tschirnhausen cubic. Every bounded arc of a Tschirnhausen cubic can be formed in this way.

Hermite interpolation is a problem of fitting a curve to points with specified higher derivatives at those points; its simplest form asks for a curve through two given points with given slopes at the two points. There is exactly one arc of a Tschirnhausen cubic that solves this problem, for each two slopes. In contrast, arbitrary cubic Bézier curves have infinitely many solutions, requiring arbitrary choices for how to fit them to this data, and quadratic Bézier curves do not provide a solution for inputs with parallel slopes. Fitting a curve to more than two points of an arbitrary smooth function, by using a sequence of splines of this special form between each two consecutive points, gives an approximation whose error is quartic in the length of the spline segments. However, because the Tschirnhausen cubic has no finite inflection points, using this method to approximate a function that has an inflection point requires one of the spline endpoints to be placed at the inflection point, to avoid loops or cusps in the approximating curve. The inability of Tschirnhausen cubics to inflect has been described as making them "inadequate ... for most practical design applications".

The Tschirnhausen cubic is an example of a Pythagorean hodograph curve. This means that it is a parametric curve whose speed, arc length, curvature, and offset curves all have rational parameterizations. Up to scaling and rotation, it is the only cubic Pythagorean hodograph curve. Specifically, for the parametric form with $x= a(1 - 3t^2)$ and $y= at(3-t^2)$, the speed is
$$v(t)=\sqrt{x'^2+y'^2}=3a + 3at^2,$$
the arc length between parameters $t_0$ and $t_1$ is the definite integral of speed,
$$\int_{t_0}^{t_1} v(t)\,dt
=(3at_1+at_1^3)-(3at_0+at_0^3),$$
and the curvature is
$$\kappa(t)=\frac2{3a(1+t^2)^2}.$$
As with any Pythagorean hodograph curve, the unit tangent vector can be given a rational parameterization by dividing the velocity vector $(x',y')$ by the speed. The unit normal vector is the same vector rotated by 90°, and each offset curve is obtained by adding a scalar multiple of the unit normal vector to the given curve. The involutes of the Tschirnhausen cubic are also rational curves, of degree 4, while its offset curves are rational of degree 5. Because its arc length has a rational parameterization, a space curve obtained from the Tschirnhausen cubic by using the arc length from a fixed reference point as its $z$-coordinate provides an example of an algebraic curve with constant slope: it maintains a fixed angle with respect to the $xy$-plane.

== Other properties ==
Two copies of the Tschirnhausen cubic as geodesics of the Enneper surface

For the Enneper surface, with its standard representation as a parametric surface, fixing either the $u$ or $v$ parameter to zero results in a geodesic on the surface in the form of the Tschirnhausen cubic. These two geodesics meet at the point where both parameters are zero.

The Tschirnhausen cubic is a special case of a sinusoidal spiral, that is, a curve with the equation $r^n=a^n\cos n\theta$ for some value of the parameter $n$. For the Tschirnhausen cubic, $n=-\tfrac13$. As with sinusoidal spirals more generally, its pedal equation has a particularly simple form. This equation relates the $r$-coordinate in polar coordinates (the distance from the origin) of any point on the curve with the distance $p$ from the origin of the tangent line through the same point. For the Tschirnhausen cubic the pedal equation is $ar^2=p^3$.

It has a single self-crossing (a node or crunode), so that an arc of the curve starting and ending at the node forms a bounded loop. The area of this loop, in the forms given above with parameter $a$, is:
$$\frac{72\sqrt3}{5}a^2\approx 24.94a^2.$$
The length of the loop, with the same parameter, is
$$12a\sqrt{3}\approx 20.78a.$$

The Tschirnhausen cubic has no finite inflection points. However, an algebraic curve in the projective plane, the Tschirnhausen cubic is tangent to the line at infinity at the point where this line is crossed by the $y$-axis. It follows from the form of its algebraic equation that it has an inflection point at this point of tangency, which is also a vertex, a local minimum of curvature.

In its polar form, for angle parameter $\theta$, the angle of the (outward) normal vector perpendicular to the curve is $2\theta/3$. Thus, for instance, at its crossing point, the parameters are $\theta=\pm\pi$ and the normal angles are $\pm2\pi/3$, forming a crossing with acute angles of $\pi/3$ (60°) inside and opposite the loop, and obtuse angles of $2\pi/3$ (120°) on the two sides of the loop. Every non-vertical line through the origin (the focus of the associated parabola) cuts the curve in three points whose tangent lines form an equilateral triangle. For this statement, one should count the symmetry axis as cutting the curve twice at its crossing point, with two tangent lines there forming an equilateral triangle with the tangent line at the vertex.

Each point of the Tschirnhausen cubic has a parabola tangent to it at that point with a focus at the origin. In the complex number parameterization where the Tschirnhausen cubic has the equation $z=2/(1-\tau)^3$, the parabola tangent to a point $\tau_0$ has the equation
$$z=\frac2{(1-\tau_0)(1-\tau)^2}.$$
The vertex of each parabola is at the point $z=1/(2-2\tau_0)$, on the vertical line tangent to the vertex of the Tschirnhausen cubic. For any two of these tangent parabolas, the associated tangent lines to the Tschirnhausen cubic (at their points of tangency) form an isosceles triangle whose base is a bitangent of the two parabolas.
