= Negative pedal curve =

Mathematical plane curve

Circle — negative pedal curve of a limaçon

In geometry, a negative pedal curve is a plane curve that can be constructed from another plane curve C and a fixed point P. For each point X ≠ P on the curve C, the negative pedal curve has a tangent that passes through X and is perpendicular to line XP. Constructing the negative pedal curve is the inverse operation to constructing a pedal curve.

== Definition ==
In the plane, for every point X other than P there is a unique line through X perpendicular to XP. For a given curve in the plane and a given fixed point P, called the pedal point, the negative pedal curve is the envelope of the lines XP for which X lies on the given curve.

== Parameterization ==
For a parametrically defined curve, its negative pedal curve with pedal point (0; 0) is defined as:

$$X[x,y]=\frac{(y^2-x^2)y'+2xyx'}{xy'-yx'}$$

$$Y[x,y]=\frac{(x^2-y^2)x'+2xyy'}{xy'-yx'}$$

== Examples ==
The negative pedal curve of a line is a parabola. The negative pedal curves of a circle are an ellipse if P is chosen to be inside the circle, and a hyperbola if P is chosen to be outside the circle. The negative pedal curve of a parabola with respect to its focus is the Tschirnhausen cubic.

== Properties ==
The negative pedal curve of a pedal curve with the same pedal point is the original curve.

== See also ==
- Fish curve, the negative pedal curve of an ellipse with squared eccentricity 1/2
