= Cayley's sextic =

Plane curve

In geometry, Cayley's sextic (sextic of Cayley, Cayley's sextet) is a plane curve, a member of the sinusoidal spiral family, first discussed by Colin Maclaurin in 1718. Arthur Cayley was the first to study the curve in detail and Raymond Clare Archibald named the curve after him.

The curve is symmetric about the x-axis (y = 0) and self-intersects at y = 0, x = −a/8. Other intercepts are at the origin, at (a, 0) and with the y-axis at ±3/8√3a

The curve is the pedal curve (or roulette) of a cardioid with respect to its cusp.

== Equations of the curve ==
The equation of the curve in polar coordinates is

r = 4a cos^{3}(θ/3)

In Cartesian coordinates the equation is

4(x^{2} + y^{2} − (a/4)x)^{3} = 27(a/4)^{2}(x^{2} + y^{2})^{2} .

Cayley's sextic may be parametrised (as a periodic function, period π, $\mathbb{R} \rarr \mathbb{R}^2$) by the equations:

- x = cos^{3}t cos 3t
- y = cos^{3}t sin 3t

The node is at t = ±π/3.
