= Astroid =

Curve generated by rolling a circle inside another circle with 4x or (4/3)x the radius

Astroid

The hypocycloid construction of the astroid

Astroid x^{2/3} + y^{2/3} = r^{2/3} as the common envelope of a family of ellipses of equation (x/a)^{2} + (y/b)^{2} = r^{2}, where a + b = 1

The envelope of a ladder (coloured lines in the top-right quadrant) sliding down a vertical wall, and its reflections (other quadrants) is an astroid. The midpoints trace out a circle while other points trace out ellipses similar to the previous figure. In the SVG file, hover over a ladder to highlight it.

Astroid as an evolute of ellipse

In mathematics, an astroid is a particular type of roulette curve: a hypocycloid with four cusps. Specifically, it is the locus of a point on a circle as it rolls inside a fixed circle with four times the radius. By double generation, it is also the locus of a point on a circle as it rolls inside a fixed circle with 4/3 times the radius. It can also be defined as the envelope of a line segment of fixed length that moves while keeping an end point on each of the axes. It is therefore the envelope of the moving bar in the Trammel of Archimedes.

Its modern name comes from the Greek word for "star". It was proposed, originally in the form of "Astrois", by Joseph Johann von Littrow in 1838. The curve had a variety of names, including tetracuspid (still used), cubocycloid, and paracycle. It is nearly identical in form to the evolute of an ellipse.

== Equations ==
If the radius of the fixed circle is a then the equation is given by
$$x^{2/3} + y^{2/3} = a^{2/3}.$$
This means that an astroid is also a superellipse.

Parametric equations are
$$\begin{align}
x = a\cos^3 t &= \frac{a}{4} \left( 3\cos \left(t\right) + \cos \left(3t\right)\right), \\[2ex]
y = a\sin^3 t &= \frac{a}{4} \left( 3\sin \left(t\right) - \sin \left(3t\right) \right).
\end{align}$$

The pedal equation with respect to the origin is
$$r^2 = a^2 - 3p^2,$$

the Whewell equation is
$$s = {3a \over 4} \cos 2\varphi,$$
and the Cesàro equation is
$$R^2 + 4s^2 = \frac{9a^2}{4}.$$

The polar equation is
$$r = \frac{a}{\left(\cos^{2/3}\theta + \sin^{2/3}\theta\right)^{3/2}}.$$

The astroid is a real locus of a plane algebraic curve of genus zero. It has the equation
$$\left(x^2 + y^2 - a^2\right)^3 + 27 a^2 x^2 y^2 = 0.$$

The astroid is, therefore, a real algebraic curve of degree six.

== Derivation of the polynomial equation ==
The polynomial equation may be derived from Leibniz's equation by elementary algebra:
$$x^{2/3} + y^{2/3} = a^{2/3}.$$

Cube both sides:
$$\begin{align}
x^{6/3} + 3x^{4/3}y^{2/3} + 3x^{2/3}y^{4/3} + y^{6/3} &= a^{6/3} \\[1.5ex]
x^2 + 3x^{2/3}y^{2/3} \left(x^{2/3} + y^{2/3}\right) + y^2 &= a^2 \\[1ex]
x^2 + y^2 - a^2 &= -3x^{2/3}y^{2/3} \left(x^{2/3} + y^{2/3}\right)
\end{align}$$

Cube both sides again:
$$\left(x^2 + y^2 - a^2\right)^3 = -27 x^2 y^2 \left(x^{2/3} + y^{2/3}\right)^3$$

But since:
$$x^{2/3} + y^{2/3} = a^{2/3} \,$$

It follows that
$$\left(x^{2/3} + y^{2/3}\right)^3 = a^2.$$

Therefore:
$$\left(x^2 + y^2 - a^2\right)^3 = -27 x^2 y^2 a^2$$
or
$$\left(x^2 + y^2 - a^2\right)^3 + 27 x^2 y^2 a^2 = 0.$$

== Metric properties ==
Area enclosed
$$\frac{3}{8} \pi a^2$$
Length of curve
$$6a$$
Volume of the surface of revolution of the enclose area about the x-axis.
$$\frac{32}{105}\pi a^3$$
Area of surface of revolution about the x-axis
$$\frac{12}{5}\pi a^2$$
Radius of the outscribed circle
$$a$$
Radius of the inscribed circle
$$a/2$$

== Properties ==
The astroid has four cusp singularities in the real plane, the points on the star. It has two more complex cusp singularities at infinity, and four complex double points, for a total of ten singularities.

The dual curve to the astroid is the cruciform curve with equation $x^2 y^2 = x^2 + y^2.$ The evolute of an astroid is an astroid twice as large.

The astroid has only one tangent line in each oriented direction, making it an example of a hedgehog.

== See also ==
- Cardioid – an epicycloid with one cusp
- Deltoid – a hypocycloid with three cusps
- Nephroid – an epicycloid with two cusps
- Spirograph
- Stoner–Wohlfarth astroid – a use of this curve in magnetics
