= Pedal equation =

Plane curve constructed from a given curve and fixed point

In Euclidean geometry, for a plane curve C and a given fixed point O, the pedal equation of the curve is a relation between r and p where r is the distance from O to a point on C and p is the perpendicular distance from O to the tangent line to C at the point. The point O is called the pedal point and the values r and p are sometimes called the pedal coordinates of a point relative to the curve and the pedal point. It is also useful to measure the distance of O to the normal p_{c} (the contrapedal coordinate) even though it is not an independent quantity and it relates to (r, p) as $p_c:=\sqrt{r^2-p^2}.$

Some curves have particularly simple pedal equations and knowing the pedal equation of a curve may simplify the calculation of certain of its properties such as curvature. These coordinates are also well suited for solving certain type of force problems in classical mechanics and celestial mechanics.

== Equations ==
=== Cartesian coordinates ===
For C given in rectangular coordinates by f(x, y) = 0, and with O taken to be the origin, the pedal coordinates of the point (x, y) are given by:

$$r=\sqrt{x^2+y^2}$$
$$p=\frac{x\frac{\partial f}{\partial x}+y\frac{\partial f}{\partial y}}{\sqrt{\left(\frac{\partial f}{\partial x}\right)^2+\left(\frac{\partial f}{\partial y}\right)^2}}.$$

The pedal equation can be found by eliminating x and y from these equations and the equation of the curve.

The expression for p may be simplified if the equation of the curve is written in homogeneous coordinates by introducing a variable z, so that the equation of the curve is g(x, y, z) = 0. The value of p is then given by

$$p=\frac{\frac{\partial g}{\partial z}}{\sqrt{\left(\frac{\partial g}{\partial x}\right)^2+\left(\frac{\partial g}{\partial y}\right)^2}}$$

where the result is evaluated at z=1

=== Polar coordinates ===
For C given in polar coordinates by r = f(θ), then

$$p=r\sin \phi$$

where $\phi$ is the polar tangential angle given by

$$r=\frac{dr}{d\theta}\tan \phi.$$

The pedal equation can be found by eliminating θ from these equations.

Alternatively, from the above we can find that

$$\left|\frac{dr}{d\theta}\right|=\frac{r p_c}{p},$$

where $p_c:=\sqrt{r^2-p^2}$ is the "contrapedal" coordinate, i.e. distance to the normal. This implies that if a curve satisfies an autonomous differential equation in polar coordinates of the form:

$$f\left(r,\left|\frac{dr}{d\theta}\right|\right)=0,$$

its pedal equation becomes

$$f\left(r,\frac{rp_c}{p}\right)=0.$$

==== Example ====
As an example take the logarithmic spiral with the spiral angle α:

$$r=a e^{\frac{\cos\alpha}{\sin\alpha} \theta}.$$

Differentiating with respect to $\theta$ we obtain

$$\frac{dr}{d\theta}= \frac{\cos\alpha}{\sin\alpha} a e^{\frac{\cos\alpha}{\sin\alpha} \theta}=\frac{\cos\alpha}{\sin\alpha} r,$$

hence

$$\left|\frac{d r}{d \theta}\right|=\left|\frac{\cos\alpha}{\sin\alpha}\right| r,$$

and thus in pedal coordinates we get

$$\frac{r}{p}p_c=\left|\frac{\cos\alpha}{\sin\alpha}\right| r, \qquad \Rightarrow \qquad |\sin\alpha| p_c=|\cos\alpha| p,$$

or using the fact that $p_c^2=r^2-p^2$ we obtain

$$p=|\sin\alpha|r.$$

This approach can be generalized to include autonomous differential equations of any order as follows: A curve C which a solution of an n-th order autonomous differential equation ($n\geq 1$) in polar coordinates

$$f\left(r,|r'_{\theta}|,r''_{\theta},|r'''_{\theta}|\dots,r_\theta^{(2j)},|r_\theta^{(2j+1)}|,\dots, r_\theta^{(n)}\right)=0,$$

is the pedal curve of a curve given in pedal coordinates by

$$f(p,p_c, p_c p_c',p_c (p_c p_c')',\dots, (p_c\partial_p)^n p)=0,$$

where the differentiation is done with respect to $p$.

=== Force problems ===
Solutions to some force problems of classical mechanics can be surprisingly easily obtained in pedal coordinates.

Consider a dynamical system:

$$\ddot x=F^\prime(|x|^2)x+2 G^\prime(|x|^2){\dot x}^\perp,$$

describing an evolution of a test particle (with position $x$ and velocity $\dot x$) in the plane in the presence of central $F$ and Lorentz like $G$ potential. The quantities:

$$L=x\cdot \dot x^\perp+G(|x|^2), \qquad c=|\dot x|^2-F(|x|^2),$$

are conserved in this system.

Then the curve traced by $x$ is given in pedal coordinates by

$$\frac{\left(L-G(r^2)\right)^2}{p^2}=F(r^2)+c,$$

with the pedal point at the origin. This fact was discovered by P. Blaschke in 2017.

==== Example ====
As an example consider the so-called Kepler problem, i.e. central force problem, where the force varies inversely as a square of the distance:

$$\ddot{x}=-\frac{M}{|x|^{3}}x,$$

we can arrive at the solution immediately in pedal coordinates

$$\frac{L^2}{2p^2}=\frac{M}{r}+c,$$,

where $L$ corresponds to the particle's angular momentum and $c$ to its energy. Thus we have obtained the equation of a conic section in pedal coordinates.

Inversely, for a given curve C, we can easily deduce what forces do we have to impose on a test particle to move along it.

== Pedal equations for specific curves ==
=== Sinusoidal spirals ===
For a sinusoidal spiral written in the form

$$r^n = a^n \sin(n \theta)$$

the polar tangential angle is

$$\psi = n\theta$$

which produces the pedal equation

$$pa^n=r^{n+1}.$$

The pedal equation for a number of familiar curves can be obtained setting n to specific values:

n	Curve	Pedal point	Pedal eq.
All	Circle with radius a	Center	$pa^n=r^{n+1}$
1	Circle with diameter a	Point on circumference	pa = r^{2}
−1	Line	Point distance a from line	p = a
1/2	Cardioid	Cusp	p^{2}a = r^{3}
−1/2	Parabola	Focus	p^{2} = ar
2	Lemniscate of Bernoulli	Center	pa^{2} = r^{3}
−2	Rectangular hyperbola	Center	rp = a^{2}

=== Spirals ===
A spiral shaped curve of the form

$$r = c \theta^\alpha,$$

satisfies the equation

$$\frac{dr}{d\theta}=\alpha r^{\frac{\alpha-1}{\alpha}},$$

and thus can be easily converted into pedal coordinates as

$$\frac{1}{p^2}=\frac{\alpha^2 c^{\frac{2}{\alpha}}}{r^{2+\frac{2}{\alpha}}}+\frac{1}{r^2}.$$

Special cases include:

$\alpha$	Curve	Pedal point	Pedal eq.
1	Spiral of Archimedes	Origin	$\frac{1}{p^2}=\frac{1}{r^2}+\frac{c^2}{r^4}$
−1	Hyperbolic spiral	Origin	$\frac{1}{p^2}=\frac{1}{r^2}+\frac{1}{c^2}$
1/2	Fermat's spiral	Origin	$\frac{1}{p^2}=\frac{1}{r^2}+\frac{c^4}{4 r^6}$
−1/2	Lituus	Origin	$\frac{1}{p^2}=\frac{1}{r^2}+\frac{r^2}{4 c^4}$

=== Epi- and hypocycloids ===
For an epi- or hypocycloid given by parametric equations

$$x (\theta) = (a + b) \cos \theta - b \cos \left( \frac{a + b}{b} \theta \right)$$
$$y (\theta) = (a + b) \sin \theta - b \sin \left( \frac{a + b}{b} \theta \right),$$

the pedal equation with respect to the origin is

$$r^2=a^2+\frac{4(a+b)b}{(a+2b)^2}p^2$$

or

$$p^2=A(r^2-a^2)$$

with

$$A=\frac{(a+2b)^2}{4(a+b)b}.$$

Special cases obtained by setting b=a/n for specific values of n include:

n	Curve	Pedal eq.
1, −1/2	Cardioid	$p^2=\frac{9}{8}(r^2-a^2)$
2, −2/3	Nephroid	$p^2=\frac{4}{3}(r^2-a^2)$
−3, −3/2	Deltoid	$p^2=-\frac{1}{8}(r^2-a^2)$
−4, −4/3	Astroid	$p^2=-\frac{1}{3}(r^2-a^2)$

=== Other curves ===
Other pedal equations are:,

Curve	Equation	Pedal point	Pedal eq.
Line	$ax+by+c=0$	Origin	$p=\frac{|c|}{\sqrt{a^2+b^2}}$
Point	$(x_0,y_0)$	Origin	$r=\sqrt{x_0^2+y_0^2}$
Circle	$|x-a|=R$	Origin	$2pR=r^2+R^2-|a|^2$
Involute of a circle	$r=\frac{a}{\cos\alpha},\ \theta=\tan\alpha-\alpha$	Origin	$p_c=|a|$
Ellipse	$\frac{x^2}{a^2}+\frac{y^2}{b^2}=1$	Center	$\frac{a^2b^2}{p^2}+r^2=a^2+b^2$
Hyperbola	$\frac{x^2}{a^2}-\frac{y^2}{b^2}=1$	Center	$-\frac{a^2b^2}{p^2}+r^2=a^2-b^2$
Ellipse	$\frac{x^2}{a^2}+\frac{y^2}{b^2}=1$	Focus	$\frac{b^2}{p^2}=\frac{2a}{r}-1$
Hyperbola	$\frac{x^2}{a^2}-\frac{y^2}{b^2}=1$	Focus	$\frac{b^2}{p^2}=\frac{2a}{r}+1$
Logarithmic spiral	$r = ae^{\theta \cot \alpha}$	Pole	$p=r \sin \alpha$
Cartesian oval	$|x|+\alpha|x-a|=C,$	Focus	$\frac{(b-(1-\alpha^2)r^2 )^2}{4p^2}=\frac{Cb}{r}+(1-\alpha^2)C r -((1-\alpha^2)C^2+b),\ b:=C^2-\alpha^2|a|^2$
Cassini oval	$|x||x-a|=C,$	Focus	$\frac{(3C^2+r^4-|a|^2 r^2)^2 }{p^2}=4C^2\left(\frac{2C^2}{r^2}+2r^2-|a|^2\right).$
Cassini oval	$|x-a||x+a|=C,$	Center	$2R pr=r^{4}+R^2-|a|^2.$

== See also ==
- Pedal curve
