= Limaçon =

Type of roulette curve

Construction of the limaçon r = 2 + cos(π – θ) with polar coordinates' origin at (x, y) = (1/2, 0)

In geometry, a limaçon or limacon (French pronunciation: [limasɔ̃]), also known as a limaçon of Pascal or Pascal's Snail, is defined as a roulette curve formed by the path of a point fixed to a circle when that circle rolls around the outside of a circle of equal radius. It can also be defined as the roulette formed when a circle rolls around a circle with half its radius so that the smaller circle is inside the larger circle. Thus, they belong to the family of curves called centered trochoids; more specifically, they are epitrochoids. The cardioid is the special case in which the point generating the roulette lies on the rolling circle; the resulting curve has a cusp.

Depending on the position of the point generating the curve, it may have inner and outer loops (giving the family its name), it may be heart-shaped, or it may be oval.

A limaçon is a bicircular rational plane algebraic curve of degree 4.

== History ==
The earliest formal research on limaçons is generally attributed to Étienne Pascal, father of Blaise Pascal. However, some insightful investigations regarding them had been undertaken earlier by the German Renaissance artist Albrecht Dürer. Dürer's Underweysung der Messung (Instruction in Measurement) contains specific geometric methods for producing limaçons. The curve was named by Gilles de Roberval when he used it as an example for finding tangent lines, deriving the word from the latin limax: snail.

== Equations ==
Three limaçons: dimpled, with cusp (a cardioid), and looped. Not shown: the convex limaçon

The equation (up to translation and rotation) of a limaçon in polar coordinates has the form

$$r = b + a \cos \theta.$$

This can be converted to Cartesian coordinates by multiplying by r (thus introducing a point at the origin which in some cases is spurious), and substituting $r^2 = x^2+y^2$ and $r \cos \theta = x$ to obtain

$$\left(x^2 + y^2 - ax\right)^2 = b^2\left(x^2 + y^2\right).$$

Applying the parametric form of the polar to Cartesian conversion, we also have

$$x = (b + a\cos \theta)\cos \theta = {a\over 2} + b \cos \theta + {a\over 2} \cos 2 \theta,$$
$$y = (b + a\cos \theta)\sin \theta = b \sin \theta + {a\over 2} \sin 2 \theta;$$

while setting

$$z = x + i y = ( b + a \cos \theta )( \cos \theta + i \sin \theta )$$

yields this parameterization as a curve in the complex plane:

$$z = {a \over 2} + b e^{i\theta} + {a\over 2} e^{2i\theta}.$$

If we were to shift horizontally by $-\frac{1}{2}a$, i.e.,

$$z = b e^{it} + {a \over 2} e^{2it}$$,

we would, by changing the location of the origin, convert to the usual form of the equation of a centered trochoid. Note the change of independent variable at this point to make it clear that we are no longer using the default polar coordinate parameterization $\theta = \arg z$.

=== Special cases ===
In the special case $a = b$, the polar equation is

$$r = b(1 + \cos \theta) = 2b\cos^2 \frac{\theta}{2}$$

or

$$r^{1 \over 2} = (2b)^{1 \over 2} \cos \frac{\theta}{2},$$

making it a member of the sinusoidal spiral family of curves. This curve is the cardioid.

In the special case $a = 2b$, the centered trochoid form of the equation becomes

$$z = b \left(e^{it} + e^{2it}\right) = b e^{3it\over 2} \left(e^{it\over 2} + e^{-it\over 2}\right) = 2b  e^{3it\over 2} \cos{t \over 2},$$

or, in polar coordinates,

$$r = 2b\cos{\theta \over 3}$$

making it a member of the rose family of curves. This curve is a trisectrix, and is sometimes called the limaçon trisectrix.

== Form ==
When $b > a$, the limaçon is a simple closed curve. However, the origin satisfies the Cartesian equation given above, so the graph of this equation has an acnode or isolated point.

When $b > 2a$, the area bounded by the curve is convex, and when $a < b < 2a$, the curve has an indentation bounded by two inflection points. At $b = 2a$, the point $(-a, 0)$ is a point of 0 curvature.

As $b$ is decreased relative to $a$, the indentation becomes more pronounced until, at $b = a$, the curve becomes a cardioid, and the indentation becomes a cusp. For $0 < b < a$, the cusp expands to an inner loop, and the curve crosses itself at the origin. As $b$ approaches 0, the loop fills up the outer curve and, in the limit, the limaçon becomes a circle traversed twice.

== Measurement ==
The area enclosed by the limaçon $r = b + a \cos \theta$ is $\left(b^2 + {{a^2} \over 2}\right)\pi$. When $b < a$ this counts the area enclosed by the inner loop twice. In this case the curve crosses the origin at angles $\pi \pm \arccos {b \over a}$, the area enclosed by the inner loop is

$$\left (b^2 + {{a^2}\over 2} \right )\arccos {b \over a} - {3\over 2} b \sqrt{a^2 - b^2},$$

the area enclosed by the outer loop is

$$\left(b^2 + {{a^2}\over 2} \right ) \left (\pi - \arccos {b \over a} \right ) + {3\over 2} b \sqrt{a^2 -b^2},$$

and the area between the loops is

$\left (b^2 + {{a^2}\over 2} \right ) \left (\pi - 2\arccos {b \over a} \right ) + 3b \sqrt{a^2 -b^2}.$

The circumference of the limaçon is given by a complete elliptic integral of the second kind:

$$4(a + b)E\left({{2\sqrt{ab}} \over a + b}\right).$$

== Relation to other curves ==
- Let $P$ be a point and $C$ be a circle whose center is not $P$. Then the envelope of those circles whose center lies on $C$ and that pass through $P$ is a limaçon.

Limaçon — pedal curve of a circle

- A pedal of a circle is a limaçon. In fact, the pedal with respect to the origin of the circle with radius $b$ and center $(a, 0)$ has polar equation $r = b + a \cos \theta$.
- The inverse with respect to the unit circle of $r = b + a \cos \theta$ is

$$r = {1 \over {b + a \cos \theta}}$$

which is the equation of a conic section with eccentricity $\tfrac{a}{b}$ and focus at the origin. Thus a limaçon can be defined as the inverse of a conic where the center of inversion is one of the foci. If the conic is a parabola then the inverse will be a cardioid, if the conic is a hyperbola then the corresponding limaçon will have an inner loop, and if the conic is an ellipse then the corresponding limaçon will have no loop.

- The conchoid of a circle with respect to a point on the circle is a limaçon.
- A particular special case of a Cartesian oval is a limaçon.

== See also ==
- Roulette
- Centered trochoid
- List of periodic functions
