= Pythagorean hodograph curve =

Type of spline curve

In mathematics, a Pythagorean hodograph curve or PH curve is a curve defined by a polynomial parametric equation for which the speed (the derivative of arc length) also has a polynomial parametric equation. This allows the arc length itself to be determined by integrating the speed. Additionally, dividing by the speed gives a rational parameterization of the unit normal to the curve, and of the parallel curves to the given curves. For these reasons, researchers have investigated the use of Pythagorean hodograph curves as splines in geometric design.

Here, "hodograph" is another word for a derivative. They are called Pythagorean hodograph curves because their derivatives obey an equation analogous to the equation in the Pythagorean theorem.

== Plane curves ==
A plane curve with polynomial parameterization $(x(t),y(t))$ is a Pythagorean hodograph curve when there exists a polynomial $\sigma(t)$ satisfying the equation of the Pythagorean theorem:
$$\sigma(t)^2=x'(t)^2+y'(t)^2.$$
Here, $\sigma(t)$ is the speed traveled by a point that takes position $(x(t),y(t))$ at time $t$.

=== Real characterization ===
The curves of this form can be generated by a formula analogous to a formula for generating Pythagorean triples. Let $u(t)$, $v(t)$, and $w(t)$ be any three polynomials, and set
$$\begin{align}
x'(t)&=\bigl(u(t)^2-v(t)^2\bigr)w(t)\\
y'(t)&=2u(t)v(t)w(t)\\
\sigma(t)&=\bigl(u(t)^2+v(t)^2\bigr)w(t)\\
\end{align}$$
Then these three polynomials obey the Pythagorean equation defining a Pythagorean hodograph curve, and the parameterization $\bigl(x(t),y(t)\bigr)$ of the curve itself can be obtained by integrating $x'(t)$ and $y'(t)$. Every Pythagorean hodograph curve takes this form.

=== Complex characterization ===
A simpler alternative formulation of this characterization applies to the regular Pythagorean hodograph curves, those whose derivative never vanishes over the range of parameters of interest. It uses the complex plane, in which a curve may be described by a single parametric equation $r(t)$. In this plane, for every regular polynomial curve $r(t)$, the curve
$$\hat r(t)=\int r'(t)^2 dt$$
defines a regular Pythagorean hodograph curve, and every regular Pythagorean hodograph curve can be obtained in this way. Because this is an indefinite integral, it can be offset by an arbitrary constant, corresponding to an arbitrary translation of the given curve. Choosing this constant to make the curve start at the origin makes the correspondence between regular curves $r(t)$ and regular Pythagorean hodograph curves $\hat r(t)$ into a bijection.

=== Examples ===
A line, parameterized by choosing $x$ and $y$ to both be linear functions of a parameter $t$, is automatically a Pythagorean hodograph curve. Its speed is a constant, a degree-zero polynomial.

There are no quadratic Pythagorean hodograph curves.

The Tschirnhausen cubic

The simplest nonlinear curves that are Pythagorean hodograph curves are cubic curves. Not every cubic curve can be parameterized in this way. The cubic Pythagorean hodograph curves can be described as Bézier curves, defined by a sequence of control points $u_1,u_2,u_3,u_4$ for which $u_1u_2u_3$ and $u_2u_3u_4$ are similar triangles. Alternatively, if these points are taken to belong to the complex plane with the differences between them defined as $\Delta_i=u_{i+1}-u_i$, then these differences must obey the equation $\Delta_1\Delta_3=\Delta_2^2$. Every such curve is an arc of a scaled Tschirnhausen cubic, and every arc of the Tschirnhausen cubic is a Pythagorean hodograph curve.

== Properties ==
=== Arc length ===
The only curve that can be parameterized by rational functions with constant speed is a line. In part for this reason, computing the lengths of many types of curve has been difficult, with closed forms known only for certain special curves. Even as simple a curve as the ellipse does not have a closed-form expression for its perimeter, which can instead be expressed as an elliptic integral. However, for Pythagorean hodograph curves, the arc length may be obtained in closed form by integrating the speed $\sigma(t)$.

=== Tangents, normals, and offsets ===
The unit tangent vector to a Pythagorean hodograph curve is obtained by dividing the parameterization to the curve by its speed, and the unit normal vector is obtained by rotating the tangent vector by 90°. This gives a parameterization by rational functions rather than by polynomials. The parallel curves of a Pythagorean hodograph curve may be obtained as linear combinations of the parameterizations of the given curve and its normal vector.

== Three dimensions ==
A three-dimensional space curve with polynomial parameterization $\bigl(x(t),y(t),z(t)\bigr)$ is a Pythagorean hodograph curve when there exists a polynomial $\sigma(t)$ satisfying the equation:
$$\sigma(t)^2=x'(t)^2+y'(t)^2+z'(t)^2.$$
These curves can be generated from polynomials over the quaternions analogously to the way plane Pythagorean hodograph curves can be generated from complex polynomials.
