= Centered trochoid =

Geometric curve formed by a circle rolling along another circle

An epitrochoid (red) with fixed circle's radius R = 3, rolling circle's radius r = 1 and distance d = 1/2 from the rolling circle's center to the generating point

A hypotrochoid (red) with R = 5, r = 3, d = 5

In geometry, a centered trochoid is the roulette formed by a circle rolling along another circle. That is, it is the path traced by a point attached to a circle as the circle rolls without slipping along a fixed circle. The term encompasses both epitrochoid and hypotrochoid. The center of this curve is defined to be the center of the fixed circle.

Alternatively, a centered trochoid can be defined as the path traced by the sum of two vectors, each moving at a uniform speed in a circle. Specifically, a centered trochoid is a curve that can be parameterized in the complex plane by

$$z = r_1 e^{i \omega_1 t} + r_2 e^{i \omega_2 t},\,$$

or in the Cartesian plane by

$$x = r_1 \cos(\omega_1 t) + r_2 \cos(\omega_2 t),$$
$$y = r_1 \sin(\omega_1 t) + r_2 \sin(\omega_2 t),\,$$

where

$$r_1, r_2, \omega_1, \omega_2 \ne 0, \quad \omega_1 \ne \omega_2.\,$$

If $\omega_1/\omega_2$ is rational then the curve is closed and algebraic. Otherwise the curve winds around the origin an infinite number of times, and is dense in the annulus with outer radius $|r_1| + |r_2|$ and inner radius $||r_1| - |r_2||$.

== Terminology ==
Most authors use epitrochoid to mean a roulette of a circle rolling around the outside of another circle, hypotrochoid to mean a roulette of a circle rolling around the inside of another circle, and trochoid to mean a roulette of a circle rolling along a line. However, some authors (for example following F. Morley) use "trochoid" to mean a roulette of a circle rolling along another circle, though this is inconsistent with the more common terminology. The term Centered trochoid as adopted by combines epitrochoid and hypotrochoid into a single concept to streamline mathematical exposition and remains consistent with the existing standard.

The term Trochoidal curve describes epitrochoids, hypotrochoids, and trochoids (see ). A trochoidal curve can be defined as the path traced by the sum of two vectors, each moving at a uniform speed in a circle or in a straight line (but not both moving in a line).

In the parametric equations given above, the curve is an epitrochoid if $\omega_1$ and $\omega_2$ have the same sign, and a hypotrochoid if they have opposite signs.

== Dual generation ==
Let a circle of radius $b$ be rolled on a circle of radius $a$, and a point $p$ is attached to the rolling circle. The fixed curve can be parameterized as $f(t) = ae^{it}$ and the rolling curve can be parameterized as either $r(t) = be^{i(a/b)t}$ or $r(t) = -be^{-i(a/b)t}$ depending on whether the parameterization traverses the circle in the same direction or in the opposite direction as the parameterization of the fixed curve. In either case we may use $r(t) = ce^{i(a/c)t}$ where $|c| = b$. Let $p$ be attached to the rolling circle at $d$. Then, applying the formula for the roulette, the point traces out a curve given by:

$$\begin{align}
f(t) + (d-r(t)){f'(t)\over r'(t)}
& = ae^{it} + (d-ce^{i(a/c)t}){aie^{it}\over aie^{i(a/c)t}} \\
& = (a-c)e^{it} + de^{i(1-a/c)t}.
\end{align}$$

This is the parameterization given above with $r_1 = a-c$, $r_2 = d$, $\omega_1 = 1$, $\omega_2 = 1-a/c$.

Conversely, given $r_1$, $r_2$, $\omega_1$, and $\omega_2$, the curve $r_1 e^{i\omega_1 t} + r_2 e^{i\omega_2 t}$ can be reparameterized as $r_1 e^{it} + r_2 e^{i(\omega_2 / \omega_1) t}$ and the equations $r_1 = a-c$, $r_2 = d$, $\omega_2 /\omega_1 = 1-a/c$ can be solved for $a$, $c$ and $d$ to get $a = r_1(1-\omega_1/\omega_2),\ c = -r_1{\omega_1/\omega_2},\ d = r_2.$

The curve $r_1 e^{i\omega_1 t} + r_2 e^{i\omega_2 t}$ remains the same if the indexes 1 and 2 are reversed but the resulting values of $a$, $c$ and $d$, in general, do not. This produces the Dual generation theorem which states that, with the exception of the special case discussed below, any centered trochoid can be generated in two essentially different ways as the roulette of a circle rolling on another circle.

== Examples ==
=== Cardioid ===
The cardioid is parameterized by $2e^{it} - e^{2it}$. Take $r_1 = 2, r_2 = -1, \omega_1 = 1, \omega_2 = 2$ to get $a=2(1-1/2) = 1, c = -2(1/2) = -1, d = -1$. The circles both have radius 1 and, since c < 0, the rolling circle is rolling around the outside of the fixed circle. The point p is 1 unit from the center of the rolling so it lies on its circumference. This is the usual definition of the cardioid. We may also parameterize the curve as $- e^{2it} + 2e^{it}$, so we may also take $r_1 = -1, r_2 = 2, \omega_1 = 2, \omega_2 = 1$ to get $a = -1(1-2) = 1, b = -(-1)(2)=2, d = 2.$ In this case the fixed circle has radius 1, the rolling circle has radius 2, and, since c > 0, the rolling circle revolves around the fixed circle in the fashion of a hula hoop. This produces an essentially different definition of the same curve.

=== Ellipse ===
If $\omega_1 = -\omega_2$ then we obtain the parametric curve $r_1 e^{it} + r_2 e^{-it}$, or $x = (r_1+r_2)\cos t, y = (r_1-r_2)\sin t\,\!$. If $|r_1| \neq |r_2|$, this is the equation of an ellipse with axes $2|r_1+r_2|$ and $2|r_1-r_2|$. Evaluating $a$, $c$, and $d$ as before; either $a = 2r_1, c = r_1, d = r_2\,\!$ or $a = 2r_2, c = r_2, d = r_1\,\!$. This gives two different ways of generating an ellipse, both of which involve a circle rolling inside a circle with twice the diameter.

=== Straight line ===
If additionally, next to $\omega_1 = -\omega_2$, $r_1=r_2=r$, then $a = 2r, b = r, c = r\,\!$ in both cases and the two ways of generating the curve are the same. In this case the curve is simply $x = 2r\cos t, y = 0\,\!$ or a segment of the x-axis.

Likewise, if $r_1=r, r_2=-r\,\!$, then $a = 2r, c = r, d = -r\,\!$ or $a = -2r, c = -r, d = r\,\!$. The circle is symmetric about the origin, so both of these give the same pair of circles. In this case the curve is simply $x = 0, y = 2r\sin t\,\!$: a segment of the y-axis.

So the case $\omega_1 = -\omega_2,\ |r_1| = |r_2|$ is an exception (in fact the only exception) to the dual generation theorem stated above. This degenerate case, in which the curve is a straight-line segment, underlies the Tusi-couple.
