= Sinusoidal spiral =

Family of curves of the form r^n = a^n cos(nθ)

Sinusoidal spirals (r^{n} = −1^{n} cos(nθ), θ = π/2) in polar coordinates and their equivalents in rectangular coordinates: n = −2: Equilateral hyperbola n = −1: Line n = −1/2: Parabola n = 1/2: Cardioid n = 1: Circle n = 2: Lemniscate of Bernoulli

In algebraic geometry, the sinusoidal spirals are a family of curves defined by the equation in polar coordinates

$$r^n = a^n \cos(n \theta)\,$$

where a is a nonzero constant and n is a rational number other than 0. With a rotation about the origin, this can also be written

$$r^n = a^n \sin(n \theta).\,$$

The term "spiral" is a misnomer, because they are not actually spirals, and often have a flower-like shape. Many well known curves are sinusoidal spirals including:

- Rectangular hyperbola (n = −2)
- Line (n = −1)
- Parabola (n = −1/2)
- Tschirnhausen cubic (n = −1/3)
- Cayley's sextic (n = 1/3)
- Cardioid (n = 1/2)
- Circle (n = 1)
- Lemniscate of Bernoulli (n = 2)

The curves were first studied by Colin Maclaurin.

== Equations ==
Differentiating

$$r^n = a^n \cos(n \theta)\,$$

and eliminating a produces a differential equation for r and θ:

$$\frac{dr}{d\theta}\cos n\theta + r\sin n\theta =0.$$

Then

$$\left(\frac{dr}{ds},\ r\frac{d\theta}{ds}\right)\cos n\theta \frac{ds}{d\theta}
= \left(-r\sin n\theta ,\ r \cos n\theta \right)
= r\left(-\sin n\theta ,\ \cos n\theta \right)$$

which implies that the polar tangential angle is

$$\psi = n\theta \pm \pi/2$$

and so the tangential angle is

$$\varphi = (n+1)\theta \pm \pi/2.$$

(The sign here is positive if r and cos nθ have the same sign and negative otherwise.)

The unit tangent vector,

$$\left(\frac{dr}{ds},\ r\frac{d\theta}{ds}\right),$$

has length one, so comparing the magnitude of the vectors on each side of the above equation gives

$$\frac{ds}{d\theta} = r \cos^{-1} n\theta = a \cos^{-1+\tfrac{1}{n}} n\theta.$$

In particular, the length of a single loop when $n>0$ is:

$$a\int_{-\tfrac{\pi}{2n}}^{\tfrac{\pi}{2n}} \cos^{-1+\tfrac{1}{n}} n\theta\ d\theta$$

The substitution $r=\cos^{\tfrac{1}{n}}(n\theta)$ induces the transformation

$$\int_{0}^{\tfrac{\pi}{2n}} \cos^{-1+\tfrac{1}{n}} n\theta\ d\theta=\int_{0}^{1}\frac{dr}{\sqrt{1-r^{2n}}}$$

Hence the length of a single loop of the spiral may be reexpressed as:

$$2a \int_{0}^{1}\frac{dr}{\sqrt{1-r^{2n}}}$$

The curvature is given by

$$\frac{d\varphi}{ds} = (n+1)\frac{d\theta}{ds} = \frac{n+1}{a} \cos^{1-\tfrac{1}{n}} n\theta.$$

== Properties ==
The inverse of a sinusoidal spiral with respect to a circle with center at the origin is another sinusoidal spiral whose value of n is the negative of the original curve's value of n. For example, the inverse of the lemniscate of Bernoulli is a rectangular hyperbola.

The isoptic, pedal and negative pedal of a sinusoidal spiral are different sinusoidal spirals.

One path of a particle moving according to a central force proportional to a power of r is a sinusoidal spiral.

When $n$ is a positive integer, the sinusoidal spiral $r^n=\cos(n\theta)$ can be described as follows. Let $n$ points be arranged symmetrically on a circle of radius $\frac{a}{2^{\frac{1}{n}}}$ centered at the origin with one point on the positive $x$-axis. Then the set of points, so that the product of the distances from that point to these $n$ points is $\frac{a^n}{2}$, is precisely this sinusoidal spiral. Consequenly the sinusoidal spiral can be identified with the set of complex numbers $z$ satisfying the equation $\left|z^n-\frac{a^n}{2}\right|=\frac{a^n}{2}$. Thus such a spiral is a polynomial lemniscate.
