= Orthocentroidal circle =

Circle constructed from a triangle

A triangle (black), its orthocenter (blue), its centroid (red), and its orthocentroidal disk (yellow)

Orthocentroidal circle bounded by the orthocenter (H) and centroid (S) Euler line, on which the circumcenter (O) and nine-point center (N) both lie along with H and S F_{1} and F_{2}: Fermat points F: Feuerbach point I: Incenter G: Gergonne point U: Symmedian point

In geometry, the orthocentroidal circle of a non-equilateral triangle is the circle that has the triangle's orthocenter and centroid at opposite ends of its diameter. This diameter also contains the triangle's nine-point center and is a subset of the Euler line, which also contains the circumcenter outside the orthocentroidal circle.

Andrew Guinand showed in 1984 that the triangle's incenter must lie in the interior of the orthocentroidal circle, but not coinciding with the nine-point center; that is, it must fall in the open orthocentroidal disk punctured at the nine-point center. The incenter could be any such point, depending on the specific triangle having that particular orthocentroidal disk.

Furthermore, the Fermat point, the Gergonne point, and the symmedian point are in the open orthocentroidal disk punctured at its own center (and could be at any point therein), while the second Fermat point and Feuerbach point are in the exterior of the orthocentroidal circle. The set of potential locations of one or the other of the Brocard points is also the open orthocentroidal disk.

The square of the diameter of the orthocentroidal circle is $D^2-\tfrac{4}{9}(a^2+b^2+c^2),$ where a, b, and c are the triangle's side lengths and D is the diameter of its circumcircle.

The orthocentroidal circle, circumcircle, nine-point circle, polar circle and circumcircle of the tangential triangle are coaxal, and all meet on the common radical axis if the triangle is not acute. The radical axis is the orthic axis.
