= Johnson circles =

Geometric theorem regarding 3 circles intersecting at a point

Johnson circles J_{A} ≅ J_{B} ≅ J_{C} of radius r (intersect at H; pairs intersect at A, B, C) Circle passing through A, B, C (has radius r by Johnson's theorem) Johnson triangle △J_{A}J_{B}J_{C} of △ABC Circumcircle of △J_{A}J_{B}J_{C} (radius r)

In geometry, a set of Johnson circles comprises three circles of equal radius r sharing one common point of intersection H. In such a configuration the circles usually have a total of four intersections (points where at least two of them meet): the common point H that they all share, and for each of the three pairs of circles one more intersection point (referred here as their 2-wise intersection). If any two of the circles happen to osculate, they only have H as a common point, and it will then be considered that H be their 2-wise intersection as well; if they should coincide we declare their 2-wise intersection be the point diametrically opposite H. The three 2-wise intersection points define the reference triangle of the figure. The concept is named after Roger Arthur Johnson.

== Properties ==
Johnson circles J_{A} ≅ J_{B} ≅ J_{C} of radius r (intersect at H; pairs intersect at A, B, C) Anticomplementary circle (radius 2r) (tangent to the Johnson circles at P_{A}, P_{B}, P_{C}) Lines between the common intersection (H) and P_{A}, P_{B}, P_{C} Anticomplementary triangle △P_{A}P_{B}P_{C}

1. The centers of the Johnson circles lie on a circle of the same radius r as the Johnson circles centered at H. These centers form the Johnson triangle.
2. The circle centered at H with radius 2r, known as the anticomplementary circle is tangent to each of the Johnson circles. The three tangent points are reflections of point H about the vertices of the Johnson triangle.
3. The points of tangency between the Johnson circles and the anticomplementary circle form another triangle, called the anticomplementary triangle of the reference triangle. It is similar to the Johnson triangle, and is homothetic by a factor 2 centered at H, their common circumcenter.
4. Johnson's theorem: The 2-wise intersection points of the Johnson circles (vertices of the reference triangle △ABC) lie on a circle of the same radius r as the Johnson circles. This property is also well known in Romania as The 5 lei coin problem of Gheorghe Țițeica.
5. The reference triangle is in fact congruent to the Johnson triangle, and is homothetic to it by a factor −1.
6. The point H is the orthocenter of the reference triangle and the circumcenter of the Johnson triangle.
7. The homothetic center of the Johnson triangle and the reference triangle is their common nine-point center.

== Proofs ==
Property 1 is obvious from the definition. Property 2 is also clear: for any circle of radius r, and any point P on it, the circle of radius 2r centered at P is tangent to the circle in its point opposite to P; this applies in particular to P = H, giving the anticomplementary circle C. Property 3 in the formulation of the homothety immediately follows; the triangle of points of tangency is known as the anticomplementary triangle.

For properties 4 and 5, first observe that any two of the three Johnson circles are interchanged by the reflection in the line connecting H and their 2-wise intersection (or in their common tangent at H if these points should coincide), and this reflection also interchanges the two vertices of the anticomplementary triangle lying on these circles. The 2-wise intersection point therefore is the midpoint of a side of the anticomplementary triangle, and H lies on the perpendicular bisector of this side. Now the midpoints of the sides of any triangle are the images of its vertices by a homothety with factor −½, centered at the barycenter of the triangle. Applied to the anticomplementary triangle, which is itself obtained from the Johnson triangle by a homothety with factor 2, it follows from composition of homotheties that the reference triangle is homothetic to the Johnson triangle by a factor −1. Since such a homothety is a congruence, this gives property 5, and also the Johnson circles theorem since congruent triangles have circumscribed circles of equal radius.

For property 6, it was already established that the perpendicular bisectors of the sides of the anticomplementary triangle all pass through the point H; since that side is parallel to a side of the reference triangle, these perpendicular bisectors are also the altitudes of the reference triangle.

Property 7 follows immediately from property 6 since the homothetic center whose factor is -1 must lie at the midpoint of the circumcenters O of the reference triangle and H of the Johnson triangle; the latter is the orthocenter of the reference triangle, and its nine-point center is known to be that midpoint. Since the central symmetry also maps the orthocenter of the reference triangle to that of the Johnson triangle, the homothetic center is also the nine-point center of the Johnson triangle.

There is also an algebraic proof of the Johnson circles theorem, using a simple vector computation. There are vectors $\vec{u}, \vec{v}, \vec{w},$ all of length r, such that the Johnson circles are centered respectively at $H+\vec{u}, H+\vec{v}, H+\vec{w}.$ Then the 2-wise intersection points are respectively $H+\vec{u}+\vec{v}, H+\vec{u}+\vec{w}, H+\vec{v}+\vec{w}$, and the point $H+\vec{u}+\vec{v}+\vec{w}$ clearly has distance r to any of those 2-wise intersection points.

== Further properties ==
The three Johnson circles can be considered the reflections of the circumcircle of the reference triangle about each of the three sides of the reference triangle. Furthermore, under the reflections about the three sides of the reference triangle, its orthocenter H maps to three points on the circumcircle of the reference triangle that form the vertices of the circum-orthic triangle, its circumcenter O maps onto the vertices of the Johnson triangle and its Euler line (line passing through O, N, H) generates three lines that are concurrent at X(110) (focus of the Kiepert parabola).

Johnson circumconic

The Johnson triangle and its reference triangle share the same nine-point center, the same Euler line and the same nine-point circle. The six points formed from the vertices of the reference triangle and its Johnson triangle all lie on the Johnson circumconic that is centered at the nine-point center and that has the point X(216) (isotomic conjugate of the circumcenter of and with respect to the medial triangle) of the reference triangle as its perspector. The circumconic and the circumcircle share a fourth point, X(110) of the reference triangle.

Finally there are two interesting and documented circumcubics that pass through the six vertices of the reference triangle and its Johnson triangle as well as the circumcenter, the orthocenter and the nine-point center. The first is known as the first Musselman cubic – K026. This cubic also passes through the six vertices of the medial triangle and the medial triangle of the Johnson triangle. The second cubic is known as the Euler central cubic – K044. This cubic also passes through the six vertices of the orthic triangle and the orthic triangle of the Johnson triangle.

The X(i) point notation is the Clark Kimberling ETC classification of triangle centers.
