= Incenter–excenter lemma =

Theorem about inscribed and circumscribed circles

In geometry, the incenter–excenter lemma is the theorem that the line segment between the incenter and any excenter of a triangle, or between two excenters, is the diameter of a circle (an incenter–excenter or excenter–excenter circle) also passing through two triangle vertices with its center on the circumcircle. This theorem is best known in Russia, where it is called the trillium theorem (теорема трилистника) or trident lemma (лемма о трезубце), based on the geometric figure's resemblance to a trillium flower or trident; these names have sometimes also been adopted in English.

These relationships arise because the incenter and excenters of any triangle form an orthocentric system whose nine-point circle is the circumcircle of the original triangle. The theorem is helpful for solving competitive Euclidean geometry problems, and can be used to reconstruct a triangle starting from one vertex, the incenter, and the circumcenter.

== Statement ==
incenter–excenter lemma with incenter I and excenter E

Let ABC be an arbitrary triangle. Let I be its incenter and let D be the point where line BI (the angle bisector of ∠ABC) crosses the circumcircle of ABC. Then, the theorem states that D is equidistant from A, C, and I. Equivalently:

- The circle through A, C, and I has its center at D. In particular, this implies that the center of this circle lies on the circumcircle.
- The three triangles AID, CID, and ACD are isosceles, with D as their apex.

A fourth point E, the excenter of ABC relative to B, also lies at the same distance from D, diametrically opposite from I.

== Proof ==
By the inscribed angle theorem, $\angle IBA = \angle DCA, \ \angle IBC = \angle DAC.$

Since $BI$ is an angle bisector, $\angle DCA = \angle DAC \implies AD = CD.$

We also get

$$\begin{align}
\angle DIA &= 180^\circ - \angle AIB \\
&= 180^\circ - (180^\circ - \angle IAB - \angle IBA) \\
&= \angle IAB + \angle IBA \\
&= \angle IAC + \angle DAC \\
&= \angle IAD \\
\implies AD &= DI.
\end{align}$$

== Application to triangle reconstruction ==
This theorem can be used to reconstruct a triangle starting from the locations only of one vertex, the incenter, and the circumcenter of the triangle. For, let B be the given vertex, I be the incenter, and O be the circumcenter. This information allows the successive construction of:

- the circumcircle of the given triangle, as the circle with center O and radius OB,
- point D as the intersection of the circumcircle with line BI,
- the circle of the theorem, with center D and radius DI, and
- vertices A and C as the intersection points of the two circles.

However, for some triples of points B, I, and O, this construction may fail, either because line IB is tangent to the circumcircle or because the two circles do not have two crossing points. It may also produce a triangle for which the given point I is an excenter rather than the incenter. In these cases, there can be no triangle having B as vertex, I as incenter, and O as circumcenter.

Other triangle reconstruction problems, such as the reconstruction of a triangle from a vertex, incenter, and center of its nine-point circle, can be solved by reducing the problem to the case of a vertex, incenter, and circumcenter.

== Generalization ==
Let I and J be any two of the four points given by the incenter and the three excenters of a triangle ABC. Then I and J are collinear with one of the three triangle vertices. The circle with IJ as diameter passes through the other two vertices and is centered on the circumcircle of ABC. When one of I or J is the incenter, this is the trillium theorem, with line IJ as the (internal) angle bisector of one of the triangle's angles. However, it is also true when I and J are both excenters; in this case, line IJ is the external angle bisector of one of the triangle's angles.

== See also ==
- Angle bisector theorem
