= Pedal triangle =

Triangle found by projecting a point onto the sides of another triangle

Triangle △ABC Perpendiculars from point P Obtained pedal triangle △LMN

In plane geometry, a pedal triangle is obtained by projecting a point onto the sides of a triangle.

More specifically, consider a triangle △ABC, and a point P that is not one of the vertices A, B, C. Drop perpendiculars from P to the three sides of the triangle (these may need to be produced, i.e., extended). Label L, M, N the intersections of the lines from P with the sides BC, AC, AB. The pedal triangle is then △LMN.

If △ABC is not an obtuse triangle and P is the orthocenter, then the angles of △LMN are 180° − 2A, 180° − 2B and 180° − 2C.

The quadrilaterals PMAN, PLBN, PLCM are cyclic quadrilaterals.

The location of the chosen point P relative to the chosen triangle △ABC gives rise to some special cases:

- If P is the orthocenter, then △LMN is the orthic triangle.
- If P is the incenter, then △LMN is the intouch triangle.
- If P is the circumcenter, then △LMN is the medial triangle.
- If P is on the circumcircle of the triangle, △LMN collapses to a line (the pedal line or Simson line).

Special case: P is on the circumcircle. Triangle △ABC Circumcircle of △ABC Perpendiculars from P Obtained pedal line LMN

The vertices of the pedal triangle of an interior point P, as shown in the top diagram, divide the sides of the original triangle in such a way as to satisfy Carnot's theorem:

$$|AN|^2 + |BL|^2 + |CM|^2 = |NB|^2 + |LC|^2 + |MA|^2.$$

== Trilinear coordinates ==
If P has trilinear coordinates p : q : r, then the vertices L, M, N of the pedal triangle of P are given by
$$\begin{array}{ccccccc}
L &=& 0 &:& q+p\cos C &:& r+p\cos B \\[2pt]
M &=& p+q\cos C &:& 0 &:& r+q\cos A \\[2pt]
N &=& p+r\cos B &:& q+r\cos A &:& 0
\end{array}$$

== Antipedal triangle ==
One vertex, L', of the antipedal triangle of P is the point of intersection of the perpendicular to BP through B and the perpendicular to CP through C. Its other vertices, M' and N', are constructed analogously. Trilinear coordinates are given by
$$\begin{array}{ccrcrcr}
L' &=& -(q+p\cos C)(r+p\cos B) &:& (r+p\cos B)(p+q\cos C) &:& (q+p\cos C)(p+r\cos B) \\[2pt]
M' &=& (r+q\cos A)(q+p\cos C) &:& -(r+q\cos A)(p+q\cos C) &:& (p+q\cos C)(q+r\cos A) \\[2pt]
N' &=& (q+r\cos A)(r+p\cos B) &:& (p+r\cos B)(r+q\cos A) &:& -(p+r\cos B)(q+r\cos A)
\end{array}$$

For example, the excentral triangle is the antipedal triangle of the incenter.

Suppose that P does not lie on any of the extended sides BC, CA, AB, and let P^{−1} denote the isogonal conjugate of P. The pedal triangle of P is homothetic to the antipedal triangle of P^{−1}. The homothetic center (which is a triangle center if and only if P is a triangle center) is the point given in trilinear coordinates by

$$ap(p+q\cos C)(p+r\cos B) \ :\ bq(q+r\cos A)(q+p\cos C) \ :\ cr(r+p\cos B)(r+q\cos A)$$

The product of the areas of the pedal triangle of P and the antipedal triangle of P^{−1} equals the square of the area of △ABC.

== Pedal circle ==
The pedal circle of the point P and its isogonal conjugate P* are the same.

The pedal circle is defined as the circumcircle of the pedal triangle. Note that the pedal circle is not defined for points lying on the circumcircle of the triangle.

=== Pedal circle of isogonal conjugates ===
For any point P not lying on the circumcircle of the triangle, it is known that P and its isogonal conjugate P* have a common pedal circle, whose center is the midpoint of these two points.
