= Polar circle (geometry) =

Unique circle centered at a given triangle's orthocenter

Reference triangle △ABC Altitudes (concur at orthocenter H; intersect extended sides of △ABC at D, E, F) Polar circle of △ABC, centered at H

In geometry, the polar circle of a triangle is the circle whose center is the triangle's orthocenter and whose squared radius is

$$\displaystyle \begin{align}
r^2 & = \overline{HA} \times \overline{HD} = \overline{HB} \times \overline{HE} = \overline{HC} \times \overline{HF} \\[4pt]
&= -4R^2 \cos A \cos B \cos C \\[4pt]
&= 4R^2 - \frac{a^2+b^2+c^2}{2}
\end{align}$$

where

A, B, and C denote both the triangle's vertices and the angle measures at those vertices;
H is the orthocenter (the intersection of the triangle's altitudes);
D, E, F are the feet of the altitudes from vertices A, B, C respectively;
R is the triangle's circumradius (the radius of its circumscribed circle);
a, b, c are the lengths of the triangle's sides opposite vertices A, B, C respectively.

The first parts of the radius formula reflect the fact that the orthocenter divides the altitudes into segment pairs of equal products. The trigonometric formula for the radius shows that the polar circle has a real existence only if the triangle is obtuse, so one of its angles is obtuse and hence has a negative cosine.

== Properties ==
Reference triangle △ABC and its tangential triangle Circumcircle e of △ABC (centered at circumcenter L) Circumcircle s of tangential triangle (centered at K) Nine-point circle t of △ABC (centered at nine-point center M) Polar circle d of △ABC (centered at orthocenter H) The centers of these circles relating to △ABC are all collinear–they fall on the Euler line.

Any two polar circles of two triangles in an orthocentric system are orthogonal.

The polar circles of the triangles of a complete quadrilateral form a coaxal system.

The most important property of the polar circle is the triangle is self-polar; the polar of each side/point is the opposite side/point.

A triangle's circumcircle, its nine-point circle, its polar circle, and the circumcircle of its tangential triangle are coaxal.
