= Power curve =

Power curve may refer to:

- The power band of an internal combustion engine, the range of speeds in which it operates efficiently
- The power curve in aerodynamics, a characteristic curve of drag vs. airspeed for airfoils
- A power law graph in statistics
- Curves used for crossfading between multiple audio signals, used in audio mixing and digital signal processing
- The relationship between statistical power and effect size (or sometimes, between statistical power and sample size).
- The power curve in geometry, the curve with trilinear coordinates (a^{t}:b^{t}:c^{t}) for a given power t.
