= Isotomic conjugate =

Point constructed from another point and a reference triangle

In geometry, the isotomic conjugate of a point P with respect to a triangle △ABC is another point, defined in a specific way from P and △ABC: If the base points of the lines PA, PB, PC on the sides opposite A, B, C are reflected about the midpoints of their respective sides, the resulting lines intersect at the isotomic conjugate of P.

== Construction ==

We assume that P is not collinear with any two vertices of △ABC. Let A', B', C' be the points in which the lines AP, BP, CP meet sidelines BC, CA, AB (extended if necessary). Reflecting A', B', C' in the midpoints of sides B̅C̅, C̅A̅, A̅B̅ will give points A", B", C" respectively. The isotomic lines AA", BB", CC" joining these new points to the vertices meet at a point (which can be proved using Ceva's theorem), the isotomic conjugate of P.

== Coordinates ==
If the trilinears for P are p : q : r, then the trilinears for the isotomic conjugate of P are

$$a^{-2}p^{-1} : b^{-2}q^{-1} : c^{-2}r^{-1},$$

where a, b, c are the side lengths opposite vertices A, B, C respectively.

== Properties ==
The isotomic conjugate of the centroid of triangle △ABC is the centroid itself.

The isotomic conjugate of the symmedian point is the third Brocard point, and the isotomic conjugate of the Gergonne point (whose Cevian triangle is the intouch triangle) is the Nagel point (whose Cevian triangle is the extouch triangle).

Isotomic conjugates of lines are circumconics, and conversely, isotomic conjugates of circumconics are lines. (This property holds for isogonal conjugates as well.)

== See also ==
- Isogonal conjugate
- Triangle center
