= Feuerbach point =

Point where the incircle and nine-point circle of a triangle are tangent

Feuerbach's theorem: the nine-point circle is tangent to the incircle and excircles of a triangle. The incircle tangency is the Feuerbach point.

In the geometry of triangles, the incircle and nine-point circle of a non-equilateral triangle are internally tangent to each other at the Feuerbach point of the triangle. The Feuerbach point is a triangle center, meaning that its definition does not depend on the placement and scale of the triangle. It is listed as X(11) in Clark Kimberling's Encyclopedia of Triangle Centers, and is named after Karl Wilhelm Feuerbach.

Feuerbach's theorem, published by Feuerbach in 1822, states more generally that the nine-point circle is tangent to the three excircles of the triangle as well as its incircle. A very short proof of this theorem based on Casey's theorem on the bitangents of four circles tangent to a fifth circle was published by John Casey in 1866; Feuerbach's theorem has also been used as a test case for automated theorem proving. The three points of tangency with the excircles form the Feuerbach triangle of the given triangle.

== Construction ==
The incircle of a triangle ABC is a circle that is tangent to all three sides of the triangle. Its center, the incenter of the triangle, lies at the point where the three internal angle bisectors of the triangle cross each other.

The nine-point circle is another circle defined from a triangle. It is so called because it passes through nine significant points of the triangle, among which the simplest to construct are the midpoints of the triangle's sides. The nine-point circle passes through these three midpoints; thus, it is the circumcircle of the medial triangle.

These two circles meet in a single point, where they are tangent to each other. That point of tangency is the Feuerbach point of the triangle. In an equilateral triangle, the nine-point circle is the same as the incircle, and the Feuerbach point is therefore not defined.

Associated with the incircle of a triangle are three more circles, the excircles. These are circles that are each tangent to the three lines through the triangle's sides. Each excircle touches one of these lines from the opposite side of the triangle, and is on the same side as the triangle for the other two lines. Like the incircle, the excircles are all tangent to the nine-point circle. Their points of tangency with the nine-point circle form a triangle, the Feuerbach triangle.

== Properties ==
The Feuerbach point lies on the line through the centers of the two tangent circles that define it. These centers are the incenter and nine-point center of the triangle.

Let $x$, $y$, and $z$ be the three distances of the Feuerbach point to the vertices of the medial triangle (the midpoints of the sides BC=a, CA=b, and AB=c respectively of the original triangle). Then,

$$x+y+z = 2\max(x,y,z),$$

or, equivalently, the largest of the three distances equals the sum of the other two. Specifically, we have $x=\frac{R}{2OI}|b-c|, \, y=\frac{R}{2OI}|c-a|, z=\frac{R}{2OI}|a-b|,$ where O is the reference triangle's circumcenter and I is its incenter.

The latter property also holds for the tangency point of any of the excircles with the nine–point circle: the greatest distance from this tangency to one of the original triangle's side midpoints equals the sum of the distances to the other two side midpoints.

If the incircle of triangle ABC touches the sides BC, CA, AB at X, Y, and Z respectively, and the midpoints of these sides are respectively P, Q, and R, then with Feuerbach point F the triangles FPX, FQY, and FRZ are similar to the triangles AOI, BOI, COI respectively.

Let $A_1,B_1,C_1$ be the midpoints of $IA,IB,IC$, respectively, where I is the incenter of triangle ABC. Let $P_1,Q_1,R_1$ be the midpoints of the arcs $QR,RP,PQ$ of the nine-point circle not containing $P,Q,R$, respectively. Then the triangles $A_1B_1C_1$ and $P_1Q_1R_1$ are perspective at the Feuerbach point F; that is, the lines $A_1P_1$, $B_1Q_1$, and $C_1R_1$ are concurrent at F.

== Coordinates ==
The trilinear coordinates for the Feuerbach point are

$$1 - \cos (B - C) : 1 - \cos (C - A) : 1 - \cos (A - B).$$

Its barycentric coordinates are

$$(s-a)(b-c)^2 : (s-b)(c-a)^2 : (s-c)(a-b)^2,$$

where s is the triangle's semiperimeter, $s = \tfrac12(a+b+c) {}$.

The three lines from the vertices of the original triangle through the corresponding vertices of the Feuerbach triangle meet at another triangle center, listed as X(12) in the Encyclopedia of Triangle Centers. Its trilinear coordinates are:

$$1 + \cos (B - C) : 1 + \cos (C - A) : 1 + \cos (A - B).$$
