= Nine-point center =

Triangle center associated with the nine-point circle

A triangle showing its circumcircle and circumcenter (black), altitudes and orthocenter (red), and nine-point circle and nine-point center (blue)

In geometry, the nine-point center is a triangle center, a point defined from a given triangle in a way that does not depend on the placement or scale of the triangle. It is so called because it is the center of the nine-point circle (also known as Feuerbach's circle after Karl Wilhelm Feuerbach), a circle that passes through nine significant points of the triangle: the midpoints of the three edges, the feet of the three altitudes, and the points halfway between the orthocenter and each of the three vertices. The nine-point center is listed as point X(5) in Clark Kimberling's Encyclopedia of Triangle Centers.

== Properties ==
The nine-point center N lies on the Euler line of its triangle, at the midpoint between that triangle's orthocenter H and circumcenter O. The centroid G also lies on the same line, 2/3 of the way from the orthocenter to the circumcenter, so
$$|NO|=|NH|=3|NG|.$$

Thus, if any two of these four triangle centers are known, the positions of the other two may be determined from them.

Andrew Guinand proved in 1984, as part of what is now known as Euler's triangle determination problem, that if the positions of these centers are given for an unknown triangle, then the incenter of the triangle lies within the orthocentroidal circle (the circle having the segment from the centroid to the orthocenter as its diameter). The only point inside this circle that cannot be the incenter is the nine-point center, and every other interior point of the circle is the incenter of a unique triangle.

The distance from the nine-point center to the incenter I satisfies
$$\begin{align}
& |IN| < \tfrac{1}{2}|IO|, \\
& |IN|=\tfrac{1}{2}(R-2r) < \frac{R}{2}, \\
& 2R\cdot |IN|=|OI|^2,
\end{align}$$
where R, r are the circumradius and inradius respectively.

The nine-point center is the circumcenter of the medial triangle of the given triangle, the circumcenter of the orthic triangle of the given triangle, and the circumcenter of the Euler triangle. More generally it is the circumcenter of any triangle defined from three of the nine points defining the nine-point circle.

The nine-point center lies at the centroid of four points: the triangle's three vertices and its orthocenter.

The Euler lines of the four triangles formed by an orthocentric system (a set of four points such that each is the orthocenter of the triangle with vertices at the other three points) are concurrent at the nine-point center common to all of the triangles.

Of the nine points defining the nine-point circle, the three midpoints of line segments between the vertices and the orthocenter are reflections of the triangle's midpoints about its nine-point center. Thus, the nine-point center forms the center of a point reflection that maps the medial triangle to the Euler triangle, and vice versa.

According to Lester's theorem, the nine-point center lies on a common circle with three other points: the two Fermat points and the circumcenter.

The Kosnita point of a triangle, a triangle center associated with Kosnita's theorem, is the isogonal conjugate of the nine-point center.

== Coordinates ==
Trilinear coordinates for the nine-point center are
$$\begin{array}{rccccc}
& \cos(B-C)  & : &  \cos(C-A)  & : &  \cos(A-B) \\[2pt]
= & \cos A+2\cos B \cos C & : & \cos B+2\cos C \cos A & : & \cos C+2\cos A\cos B \\[2pt]
= & \cos A-2\sin B \sin C & : & \cos B-2\sin C\sin A & : & \cos C-2\sin A\sin B \\[2pt]
= & bc\left[a^2(b^2+c^2)-(b^2-c^2)^2\right] & : & ca\left[b^2(c^2+a^2)-(c^2-a^2)^2\right] & : & ab\left[c^2(a^2+b^2)-(a^2-b^2)^2\right].
\end{array}$$

The barycentric coordinates of the nine-point center are
$$\begin{array}{rcccl}
( & a\cos(B-C), &  b\cos (C-A), & c\cos (A-B) & )\\[2pt]
={} ( & a^2(b^2+c^2)-(b^2-c^2)^2, &  b^2(c^2+a^2)-(c^2-a^2)^2, & c^2(a^2+b^2)-(a^2-b^2)^2 & ).
\end{array}$$

Thus if and only if two of the vertex angles differ from each other by more than 90°, one of the barycentric coordinates is negative and so the nine-point center is outside the triangle.
