= Triangle center =

Point in a triangle that can be seen as its middle under some criteria

Five important triangle centers. Reference triangle △ABC Angle bisectors and incircle (intersect/centered at incenter I) Medians (intersect at centroid G) Perpendicular bisectors and circumcircle (intersect/centered at circumcenter O) Altitudes (intersect at orthocenter H) Nine-point circle (centered at nine-point center N which, along with H, G, O, lies on the Euler line e)

In geometry, a triangle center or triangle centre is a point in the triangle's plane that is in some sense in the middle of the triangle. For example, the centroid, circumcenter, incenter and orthocenter were familiar to the ancient Greeks, and can be obtained by simple constructions.

Each of these classical centers has the property that it is invariant (more precisely equivariant) under similarity transformations. In other words, for any triangle and any similarity transformation (such as a rotation, reflection, dilation, or translation), the center of the transformed triangle is the same point as the transformed center of the original triangle. This invariance is the defining property of a triangle center. It rules out other well-known points such as the Brocard points which are not invariant under reflection and so fail to qualify as triangle centers.

For an equilateral triangle, all triangle centers coincide at its centroid. However, the triangle centers generally take different positions from each other on all other triangles. The definitions and properties of tens of thousands of triangle centers have been collected in the Encyclopedia of Triangle Centers.

== History ==
Even though the ancient Greeks discovered the classic centers of a triangle, they had not formulated any definition of a triangle center. After the ancient Greeks, several special points associated with a triangle like the Fermat point, nine-point center, Lemoine point, Gergonne point, and Feuerbach point were discovered.

During the revival of interest in triangle geometry in the 1980s it was noticed that these special points share some general properties that now form the basis for a formal definition of triangle center. Clark Kimberling's Encyclopedia of Triangle Centers contains an annotated list of over 50,000 triangle centers. Every entry in the Encyclopedia of Triangle Centers is denoted by $X(n)$ or $X_n$ where $n$ is the positional index of the entry. For example, the centroid of a triangle is the second entry and is denoted by $X(2)$ or $X_2$.

== Formal definition ==
If a real-valued function f of three real variables a, b, c has the following properties:

- Homogeneity: $f(ta,tb,tc) = t^n f(a,b,c)$ for some constant n and for all t > 0
- Bisymmetry in the second and third variables: $f(a,b,c) = f(a,c,b)$

it is called a triangle center function. If f is a triangle center function and a, b, c are the side-lengths of a reference triangle then the point whose trilinear coordinates are
$$f(a,b,c) : f(b,c,a) : f(c,a,b)$$
is called a triangle center.

This definition ensures that triangle centers of similar triangles meet the invariance criteria specified above. By convention only the first of the three trilinear coordinates of a triangle center is quoted since the other two are obtained by cyclic permutation of a, b, c. This process is known as cyclicity.

Every triangle center function corresponds to a unique triangle center, but this correspondence is not bijective; different functions may define the same triangle center. For example, the functions
$$f_1(a,b,c) = \frac{1}{a}$$
and
$$f_2(a,b,c) = bc$$
both correspond to the centroid. Two triangle center functions define the same triangle center if and only if their ratio is a function symmetric in a, b, c.

Even if a triangle center function is well-defined everywhere the same cannot always be said for its associated triangle center. For example, let $f(a,b,c) = 0$ if $\frac a b$ and $\frac a c$ are both rational and $f(a,b,c) = 1$ otherwise. Then for any triangle with integer sides the associated triangle center evaluates to 0:0:0 which is undefined.

=== Default domain ===
In some cases these functions are not defined on the whole of $\R^3.$ For example, the trilinears of X_{365} which is the 365th entry in the Encyclopedia of Triangle Centers, are $a^{1/2} : b^{1/2} : c^{1/2}$ so a, b, c cannot be negative. Furthermore, in order to represent the sides of a triangle they must satisfy the triangle inequality. So, in practice, every function's domain is restricted to the region of $\R^3$ where
$$a \leq b + c, \quad b \leq c + a, \quad c \leq a + b.$$
This region T is the domain of all triangles, and it is the default domain for all triangle-based functions.

=== Other useful domains ===
There are various instances where it may be desirable to restrict the analysis to a smaller domain than T. For example:

- The centers X_{3}, X_{4}, X_{22}, X_{24}, X_{40} make specific reference to acute triangles, namely that region of T where
  $$a^2 \leq b^2 + c^2, \quad b^2 \leq c^2 + a^2, \quad c^2 \leq a^2 + b^2.$$
- When differentiating between the Fermat point and X_{13} the domain of triangles with an angle exceeding 2π/3 is important; in other words, triangles for which any of the following is true:

$$a^2 > b^2 + bc + c^2; \quad b^2 > c^2 + ca + a^2; \quad c^2 > a^2 + ab + b^2.$$

- A domain of much practical value since it is dense in T yet excludes all trivial triangles (i.e. points) and degenerate triangles (i.e. lines) is the set of all scalene triangles. It is obtained by removing the planes b = c, c = a, a = b from T.

=== Domain symmetry ===
Not every subset D ⊆ T is a viable domain. In order to support the bisymmetry test D must be symmetric about the planes b = c, c = a, a = b. To support cyclicity it must also be invariant under 2π/3 rotations about the line a = b = c. The simplest domain of all is the line (t, t, t) which corresponds to the set of all equilateral triangles.

== Examples ==
=== Circumcenter ===
The point of concurrence of the perpendicular bisectors of the sides of triangle △ABC is the circumcenter. The trilinear coordinates of the circumcenter are

$$a(b^2 + c^2 - a^2) : b(c^2 + a^2 - b^2) : c(a^2 + b^2 - c^2).$$

Let $f\left(a,b,c\right)=a\left(b^{2}+c^{2}-a^{2}\right)$ It can be shown that f is homogeneous:
$$\begin{align}
f(ta,tb,tc) &= ta \Bigl[ (tb)^2 + (tc)^2 - (ta)^2 \Bigr] \\[2pt]
&= t^3 \Bigl[ a(b^2 + c^2 - a^2) \Bigr] \\[2pt]
&= t^3 f(a,b,c)
\end{align}$$
as well as bisymmetric:
$$\begin{align}
f(a,c,b) &= a(c^2 + b^2 - a^2) \\[2pt]
&= a(b^2 + c^2 - a^2) \\[2pt]
&= f(a,b,c)
\end{align}$$
so f is a triangle center function. Since the corresponding triangle center has the same trilinears as the circumcenter, it follows that the circumcenter is a triangle center.

=== 1st isogonic center ===
Let △A'BC be the equilateral triangle having base BC and vertex A' on the negative side of BC and let △AB'C and △ABC' be similarly constructed equilateral triangles based on the other two sides of triangle △ABC. Then the lines AA', BB', CC' are concurrent and the point of concurrence is the 1st isogonal center. Its trilinear coordinates are

$\csc\left(A + \frac{\pi}{3}\right) : \csc\left(B + \frac{\pi}{3}\right) : \csc\left(C + \frac{\pi}{3}\right).$

Expressing these coordinates in terms of a, b, c, one can verify that they indeed satisfy the defining properties of the coordinates of a triangle center. Hence the 1st isogonic center is also a triangle center.

=== Fermat point ===
Let

$$f(a, b, c) = \begin{cases}
1 & \quad \text{if } a^2 > b^2 + bc + c^2 & \iff \text{if } A > 2\pi/3 \\[8pt]
0 & \quad \!\! \displaystyle {{\text{if } b^2 > c^2 + ca + a^2} \atop {\text{ or } c^2 > a^2 + ab + b^2}} & \iff \!\! \displaystyle {{\text{if } B > 2\pi/3} \atop {\text{ or } C > 2\pi/3}} \\[8pt]
\csc(A + \frac{\pi}{3}) & \quad \text{otherwise } & \iff A,B,C \le 2\pi/3
\end{cases}$$

Then f is bisymmetric and homogeneous so it is a triangle center function. Moreover, the corresponding triangle center coincides with the obtuse angled vertex whenever any vertex angle exceeds $\tfrac {2\pi}{3}$, and with the 1st isogonic center otherwise. Therefore, this triangle center is none other than the Fermat point.

== Non-examples ==
=== Brocard points ===
The trilinear coordinates of the first Brocard point are:
$$\frac{c}{b} \ :\ \frac{a}{c} \ :\ \frac{b}{a}$$
These coordinates satisfy the properties of homogeneity and cyclicity but not bisymmetry. So the first Brocard point is not (in general) a triangle center. The second Brocard point has trilinear coordinates:
$$\frac{b}{c} \ :\ \frac{c}{a} \ :\ \frac{a}{b}$$
and similar remarks apply.

The first and second Brocard points are one of many bicentric pairs of points, pairs of points defined from a triangle with the property that the pair (but not each individual point) is preserved under similarities of the triangle. Several binary operations, such as midpoint and trilinear product, when applied to the two Brocard points, as well as other bicentric pairs, produce triangle centers.

== Some well-known triangle centers ==
=== Classical triangle centers ===
ETC reference; Name; Symbol			Trilinear coordinates	Description
X_{1}	Incenter	I	$1 : 1 : 1$	Intersection of the angle bisectors. Center of the triangle's inscribed circle.
X_{2}	Centroid	G	$bc : ca : ab$	Intersection of the medians. Center of mass of a uniform triangular lamina.
X_{3}	Circumcenter	O	$\cos A : \cos B : \cos C$	Intersection of the perpendicular bisectors of the sides. Center of the triangle's circumscribed circle.
X_{4}	Orthocenter	H	$\sec A : \sec B : \sec C$	Intersection of the altitudes.
X_{5}	Nine-point center	N	$\cos(B-C) : \cos(C-A) : \cos(A-B)$	Center of the circle passing through the midpoint of each side, the foot of each altitude, and the midpoint between the orthocenter and each vertex.
X_{6}	Symmedian point	K	$a : b : c$	Intersection of the symmedians – the reflection of each median about the corresponding angle bisector.
X_{7}	Gergonne point	G_{e}	$\frac{bc}{b+c-a} : \frac{ca}{c+a-b} : \frac{ab}{a+b-c}$	Intersection of the lines connecting each vertex to the point where the incircle touches the opposite side.
X_{8}	Nagel point	N_{a}	$\frac{b+c-a}{a} : \frac{c+a-b}{b} : \frac{a+b-c}{c}$	Intersection of the lines connecting each vertex to the point where an excircle touches the opposite side.
X_{9}	Mittenpunkt	M	$(b+c-a) : (c+a-b) : (a+b-c)$	Symmedian point of the excentral triangle (and various equivalent definitions).
X_{10}	Spieker center	S_{p}	$bc(b+c) : ca(c+a) : ab(a+b)$	Incenter of the medial triangle. Center of mass of a uniform triangular wireframe.
X_{11}	Feuerbach point	F	$1-\cos(B-C) : 1-\cos(C-A) : 1-\cos(A-B)$	Point at which the nine-point circle is tangent to the incircle.
X_{13}	Fermat point	X	$\csc(A + \tfrac{\pi}{3}) : \csc(B + \tfrac{\pi}{3}) : \csc(C + \tfrac{\pi}{3}).$ (Note: actually the 1st isogonic center, but also the Fermat point whenever A,B,C ≤ 2π/3)	Point that is the smallest possible sum of distances from the vertices.
X_{15} X_{16}	Isodynamic points	S S′	$$\begin{align} \sin(A + \tfrac{\pi}{3}) : \sin(B + \tfrac{\pi}{3}) : \sin(C + \tfrac{\pi}{3}) \\ \sin(A - \tfrac{\pi}{3}) : \sin(B - \tfrac{\pi}{3}) : \sin(C - \tfrac{\pi}{3}) \end{align}$$	Centers of inversion that transform the triangle into an equilateral triangle.
X_{17} X_{18}	Napoleon points	N N′	$$\begin{align} \sec(A - \tfrac{\pi}{3}) : \sec(B - \tfrac{\pi}{3}) : \sec(C - \tfrac{\pi}{3}) \\ \sec(A + \tfrac{\pi}{3}) : \sec(B + \tfrac{\pi}{3}) : \sec(C + \tfrac{\pi}{3}) \end{align}$$	Intersection of the lines connecting each vertex to the center of an equilateral triangle pointed outwards (first Napoleon point) or inwards (second Napoleon point), mounted on the opposite side.
X_{99}	Steiner point	S	$\frac{bc}{b^2 - c^2} : \frac{ca}{c^2 - a^2} : \frac{ab}{a^2 - b^2}$	Various equivalent definitions.

=== Recent triangle centers ===
In the following table of more recent triangle centers, no specific notations are mentioned for the various points. Also for each center only the first trilinear coordinate f(a,b,c) is specified. The other coordinates can be easily derived using the cyclicity property of trilinear coordinates.

ETC reference; Name		Center function $f(a,b,c)$	Year described
X_{21}	Schiffler point	$\frac{1}{\cos B + \cos C}$	1985
X_{22}	Exeter point	$a(b^4 + c^4 - a^4)$	1986
X_{111}	Parry point	$\frac{a}{2a^2 - b^2 - c^2}$	early 1990s
X_{173}	Congruent isoscelizers point	$\tan\tfrac{A}{2} + \sec\tfrac{A}{2}$	1989
X_{174}	Yff center of congruence	$\sec\tfrac{A}{2}$	1987
X_{175}	Isoperimetric point	$\sec\tfrac{A}{2} \cos\tfrac{B}{2} \cos\tfrac{C}{2} -1$	1985
X_{179}	First Ajima-Malfatti point	$\sec^4\tfrac{A}{4}$	
X_{181}	Apollonius point	$\frac{a(b + c)^2}{b + c - a}$	1987
X_{192}	Equal parallelians point	$bc(ca+ab-bc)$	1961
X_{356}	Morley center	$\cos\tfrac{A}{3} + 2\cos\tfrac{B}{3} \cos\tfrac{C}{3}$	1978
X_{360}	Hofstadter zero point	$\frac{A}{a}$	1992

== General classes of triangle centers ==
=== Kimberling center ===
In honor of Clark Kimberling who created the online encyclopedia of more than 32,000 triangle centers, the triangle centers listed in the encyclopedia are collectively called Kimberling centers.

=== Polynomial triangle center ===
A triangle center P is called a polynomial triangle center if the trilinear coordinates of P can be expressed as polynomials in a, b, c.

=== Regular triangle center ===
A triangle center P is called a regular triangle point if the trilinear coordinates of P can be expressed as polynomials in △, a, b, c, where △ is the area of the triangle.

=== Major triangle center ===
A triangle center P is said to be a major triangle center if the trilinear coordinates of P can be expressed in the form $f(A) : f(B) : f(C)$ where $f(X)$ is a function of the angle X alone and does not depend on the other angles or on the side lengths.

=== Transcendental triangle center ===
A triangle center P is called a transcendental triangle center if P has no trilinear representation using only algebraic functions of a, b, c.

== Miscellaneous ==
=== Isosceles and equilateral triangles ===
Let f be a triangle center function. If two sides of a triangle are equal (say a = b) then
$$\begin{align}
f(a,b,c) &= f(b,a,c) &(\text{since }a = b)\\
&= f(b,c,a) & \text{(by bisymmetry)}
\end{align}$$
so two components of the associated triangle center are always equal. Therefore, all triangle centers of an isosceles triangle must lie on its line of symmetry. For an equilateral triangle all three components are equal so all centers coincide with the centroid. So, like a circle, an equilateral triangle has a unique center.

=== Excenters ===
Let
$$f(a, b, c) = \begin{cases}
-1 & \quad \text{if } a \ge b \text{ and } a \ge c, \\
\;\;\; 1 & \quad \text{otherwise}.
\end{cases}$$

This is readily seen to be a triangle center function and (provided the triangle is scalene) the corresponding triangle center is the excenter opposite to the largest vertex angle. The other two excenters can be picked out by similar functions. However, as indicated above only one of the excenters of an isosceles triangle and none of the excenters of an equilateral triangle can ever be a triangle center.

=== Biantisymmetric functions ===
A function f is biantisymmetric if
$$f(a,b,c) = -f(a,c,b) \quad \text{for all} \quad a,b,c.$$
If such a function is also non-zero and homogeneous it is easily seen that the mapping
$$(a,b,c) \to f(a,b,c)^2 \, f(b,c,a) \, f(c,a,b)$$
is a triangle center function. The corresponding triangle center is
$$f(a,b,c) : f(b,c,a) : f(c,a,b).$$
On account of this the definition of triangle center function is sometimes taken to include non-zero homogeneous biantisymmetric functions.

=== New centers from old ===
Any triangle center function f can be normalized by multiplying it by a symmetric function of a, b, c so that n = 0. A normalized triangle center function has the same triangle center as the original, and also the stronger property that
$$f(ta,tb,tc) = f(a,b,c) \quad \text{for all} \quad t > 0, \ (a,b,c).$$
Together with the zero function, normalized triangle center functions form an algebra under addition, subtraction, and multiplication. This gives an easy way to create new triangle centers. However distinct normalized triangle center functions will often define the same triangle center, for example f and $(abc)^{-1}(a+b+c)^3 f.$

=== Uninteresting centers ===
Assume a, b, c are real variables and let α, β, γ be any three real constants. Let

$$f(a, b, c) = \begin{cases}
\alpha & \quad \text{if } a < b \text{ and } a < c & (a \text{ is least}), \\[2pt]
\gamma & \quad \text{if } a > b \text{ and } a > c & (a \text{ is greatest}), \\[2pt]
\beta & \quad \text{otherwise} & (a \text{ is in the middle}).
\end{cases}$$

Then f is a triangle center function and α : β : γ is the corresponding triangle center whenever the sides of the reference triangle are labelled so that a < b < c. Thus every point is potentially a triangle center. However, the vast majority of triangle centers are of little interest, just as most continuous functions are of little interest.

=== Barycentric coordinates ===
If f is a triangle center function then so is af and the corresponding triangle center is
$$a \, f(a,b,c) : b \, f(b,c,a) : c \, f(c,a,b).$$
Since these are precisely the barycentric coordinates of the triangle center corresponding to f it follows that triangle centers could equally well have been defined in terms of barycentrics instead of trilinears. In practice it isn't difficult to switch from one coordinate system to the other.

=== Binary systems ===
There are other center pairs besides the Fermat point and the 1st isogonic center. Another system is formed by X_{3} and the incenter of the tangential triangle. Consider the triangle center function given by:

$$f(a, b, c) = \begin{cases}
\cos A & \text{if } \triangle \text{ is acute}, \\[2pt]
\cos A + \sec B \sec C & \text{if } \measuredangle A \text{ is obtuse}, \\[2pt]
\cos A - \sec A & \text{if either} \measuredangle B \text{ or } \measuredangle C \text{ is obtuse}.
\end{cases}$$

For the corresponding triangle center there are four distinct possibilities:
$$\begin{align}
& \text{if reference } \triangle \text{ is acute:} \quad \cos A \ :\, \cos B \ :\, \cos C \\[6pt]
& \begin{array}{rcccc}
\text{if } \measuredangle A \text{ is obtuse:} &  \cos A + \sec B \sec C &:& \cos B - \sec B &:& \cos C - \sec C \\[4pt]
\text{if } \measuredangle B \text{ is obtuse:} & \cos A - \sec A &:& \cos B + \sec C \sec A &:& \cos C - \sec C \\[4pt]
\text{if } \measuredangle C \text{ is obtuse:} &  \cos A - \sec A &:& \cos B - \sec B &:& \cos C + \sec A \sec B
\end{array}\end{align}$$
Note that the first is also the circumcenter.

Routine calculation shows that in every case these trilinears represent the incenter of the tangential triangle. So this point is a triangle center that is a close companion of the circumcenter.

=== Bisymmetry and invariance ===
Reflecting a triangle reverses the order of its sides. In the image the coordinates refer to the (c, b, a) triangle and (using "|" as the separator) the reflection of an arbitrary point $\gamma : \beta : \alpha$ is $\gamma\ |\ \beta \ |\ \alpha.$ If f is a triangle center function the reflection of its triangle center is $f(c,a,b)\ |\ f(b,c,a)\ |\ f(a,b,c),$ which, by bisymmetry, is the same as $f(c,b,a)\ |\ f(b,a,c)\ |\ f(a,c,b).$ As this is also the triangle center corresponding to f relative to the (c, b, a) triangle, bisymmetry ensures that all triangle centers are invariant under reflection. Since rotations and translations may be regarded as double reflections they too must preserve triangle centers. These invariance properties provide justification for the definition.

=== Alternative terminology ===
Some other names for dilation are uniform scaling, isotropic scaling, homothety, and homothecy.

== Non-Euclidean and other geometries ==
The study of triangle centers traditionally is concerned with Euclidean geometry, but triangle centers can also be studied in non-Euclidean geometry. Triangle centers that have the same form for both Euclidean and hyperbolic geometry can be expressed using gyrotrigonometry. In non-Euclidean geometry, the assumption that the interior angles of the triangle sum to 180 degrees must be discarded.

Centers of tetrahedra or higher-dimensional simplices can also be defined, by analogy with 2-dimensional triangles.

Some centers can be extended to polygons with more than three sides. The centroid, for instance, can be found for any polygon. Some research has been done on the centers of polygons with more than three sides.

== See also ==
- Central line
- Encyclopedia of Triangle Centers
- Triangle conic
- Central triangle
- Modern triangle geometry
- Euler line
