= Harcourt's theorem =

Formula for the area of a triangle

Harcourt's theorem is a formula in geometry for the area of a triangle, as a function of its side lengths and the perpendicular distances of its vertices from an arbitrary line tangent to its incircle.

The theorem is named after J. Harcourt, an Irish professor.

== Statement ==
Let a triangle be given with vertices A, B, and C, opposite sides of lengths a, b, and c, area K, and a line that is tangent to the triangle's incircle at any point on that circle. Denote the signed perpendicular distances of the vertices from the line as a ', b ', and c ', with a distance being negative if and only if the vertex is on the opposite side of the line from the incenter. Then

$$a a ^\prime + b b^\prime + c c^\prime = 2K.$$

== Degenerate case ==
If the tangent line contains one of the sides of the triangle, then two of the distances are zero and the formula collapses to the familiar formula that twice the area of a triangle is a base (the coinciding triangle side) times the altitude from that base.

== Extension ==
If the line is instead tangent to the excircle opposite, say, vertex A of the triangle, then

$$-a a ^\prime + b b^\prime + c c^\prime = 2K.$$

== Dual property ==
If rather than a', b', c' referring to distances from a vertex to an arbitrary incircle tangent line, they refer instead to distances from a sideline to an arbitrary point, then the equation

$$a a ^\prime + b b^\prime + c c^\prime = 2K.$$

remains true.
