= Exsymmedian =

Line tangent to a given triangle's circumcircle at one its vertices

Reference triangle △ABC Circumcircle of △ABC Exsymmedians (e_{a}, e_{b}, e_{c}); intersect at the exsymmedian points (E_{a}, E_{b}, E_{c}) Symmedians (s_{a}, s_{b}, s_{c})

In Euclidean geometry, the exsymmedians are three lines associated with a triangle. More precisely, for a given triangle the exsymmedians are the tangent lines on the triangle's circumcircle through the three vertices of the triangle. The triangle formed by the three exsymmedians is the tangential triangle; its vertices, that is the three intersections of the exsymmedians, are called exsymmedian points.

For a triangle △ABC with e_{a}, e_{b}, e_{c} being the exsymmedians and s_{a}, s_{b}, s_{c} being the symmedians through the vertices A, B, C, two exsymmedians and one symmedian intersect in a common point:

$$\begin{align}
E_a&=e_b \cap e_c \cap s_a \\
E_b&=e_a \cap e_c \cap s_b \\
E_c&=e_a \cap e_b \cap s_c
\end{align}$$

The length of the perpendicular line segment connecting a triangle side with its associated exsymmedian point is proportional to that triangle side. Specifically the following formulas apply:

$$\begin{align}
k_a&=a\cdot \frac{2\triangle}{c^2+b^2-a^2} \\[6pt]
k_b&=b\cdot \frac{2\triangle}{c^2+a^2-b^2} \\[6pt]
k_c&=c\cdot \frac{2\triangle}{a^2+b^2-c^2}
\end{align}$$

Here △ denotes the area of the triangle △ABC, and k_{a}, k_{b}, k_{c} denote the perpendicular line segments connecting the triangle sides a, b, c with the exsymmedian points E_{a}, E_{b}, E_{c}.
