= Nine-point circle =

Circle constructed from a triangle

The nine points

In geometry, the nine-point circle is a circle that can be constructed for any given triangle. It is so named because it passes through nine significant concyclic points defined from the triangle. These nine points are:

- The midpoint of each side of the triangle
- The foot of each altitude
- The Euler points: the midpoint of the line segment from each vertex of the triangle to the orthocenter (where the three altitudes meet; these line segments lie on their respective altitudes).

The nine-point circle is also known as Feuerbach's circle (after Karl Wilhelm Feuerbach), Euler's circle (after Leonhard Euler), Terquem's circle (after Olry Terquem), the six-points circle, the twelve-points circle, the n-point circle, the medioscribed circle, the mid circle or the circum-midcircle. Its center is the nine-point center of the triangle.

== Nine Significant Points of Nine Point Circle ==

The diagram above shows the nine significant points of the nine-point circle. Points D, E, F are the midpoints of the three sides of the triangle. Points G, H, I are the feet of the altitudes of the triangle. Points J, K, L are the midpoints of the line segments between each altitude's vertex intersection (points A, B, C) and the triangle's orthocenter (point S).

For an acute triangle, six of the points (the midpoints and altitude feet) lie on the triangle itself; for an obtuse triangle two of the altitudes have feet outside the triangle, but these feet still belong to the nine-point circle.

== Discovery ==
Although he is often credited for its discovery, Karl Wilhelm Feuerbach's work concerned the six-point circle, through the three side midpoints and the three altitude feet, and established its tangency to the incircle and excircles. A year earlier, however, in 1821, Charles Brianchon and Jean-Victor Poncelet had already stated and proved the theorem in their 1821 paper: the same circle also passes through the midpoints of the three segments joining the vertices to the orthocenter, in addition to six points. Olry Terquem later gave an independent proof in 1842, including the location of the center, the radius, and the tangency properties. Terquem is generally credited to be the first to use the name nine-point circle.

== Tangent circles ==
The nine-point circle is tangent to the incircle and excircles.

In 1822 Karl Feuerbach discovered that any triangle's nine-point circle is externally tangent to that triangle's three excircles and internally tangent to its incircle; this result is known as Feuerbach's theorem. He proved that:

... the circle which passes through the feet of the altitudes of a triangle is tangent to all four circles which in turn are tangent to the three sides of the triangle...

The triangle center at which the incircle and the nine-point circle touch is called the Feuerbach point.

== Other properties of the nine-point circle ==
- The radius of a triangle's circumcircle is twice the radius of that triangle's nine-point circle.
  Figure 3
- A nine-point circle bisects a line segment going from the corresponding triangle's orthocenter to any point on its circumcircle.
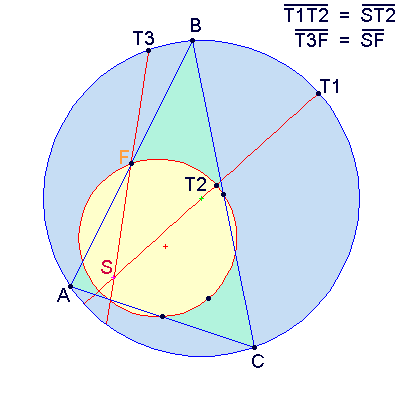
  Figure 4
- The center N of the nine-point circle bisects a segment from the orthocenter H to the circumcenter O (making the orthocenter a center of dilation to both circles):
  $$\overline{ON} = \overline{NH}.$$
- The nine-point center N is one-fourth of the way along the Euler line from the centroid G to the orthocenter H:
  $$\overline{HN} = 3\overline{NG}.$$
- Let ω be the nine-point circle of the diagonal triangle of a cyclic quadrilateral. The point of intersection of the bimedians of the cyclic quadrilateral belongs to the nine-point circle.
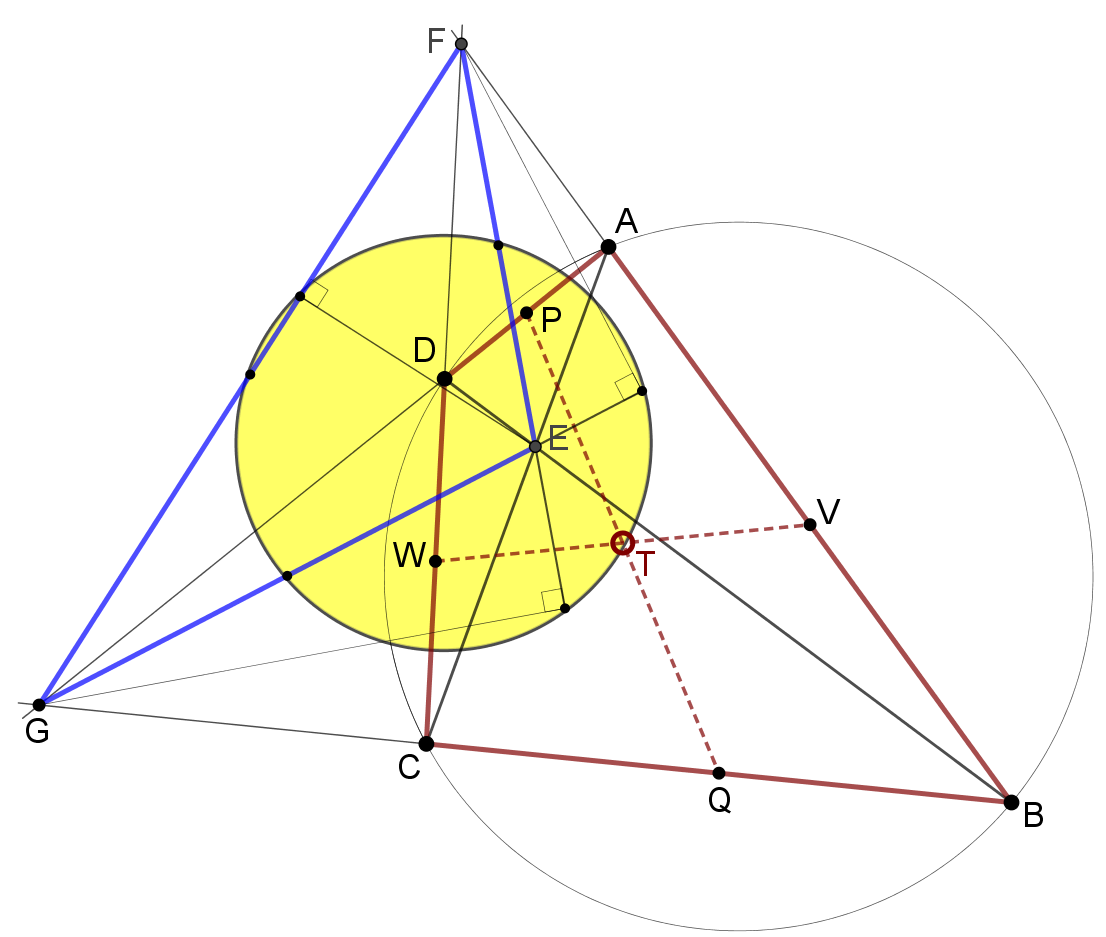
  ABCD is a cyclic quadrilateral. △EFG is the diagonal triangle of ABCD. The point T of intersection of the bimedians of ABCD belongs to the nine-point circle of △EFG.
- The nine-point circle of a reference triangle is the circumcircle of both the reference triangle's medial triangle (with vertices at the midpoints of the sides of the reference triangle) and its orthic triangle (with vertices at the feet of the reference triangle's altitudes).
- The center of all rectangular hyperbolas that pass through the vertices of a triangle lies on its nine-point circle. Examples include the well-known rectangular hyperbolas of Keipert, Jeřábek and Feuerbach. This fact is known as the Feuerbach conic theorem.
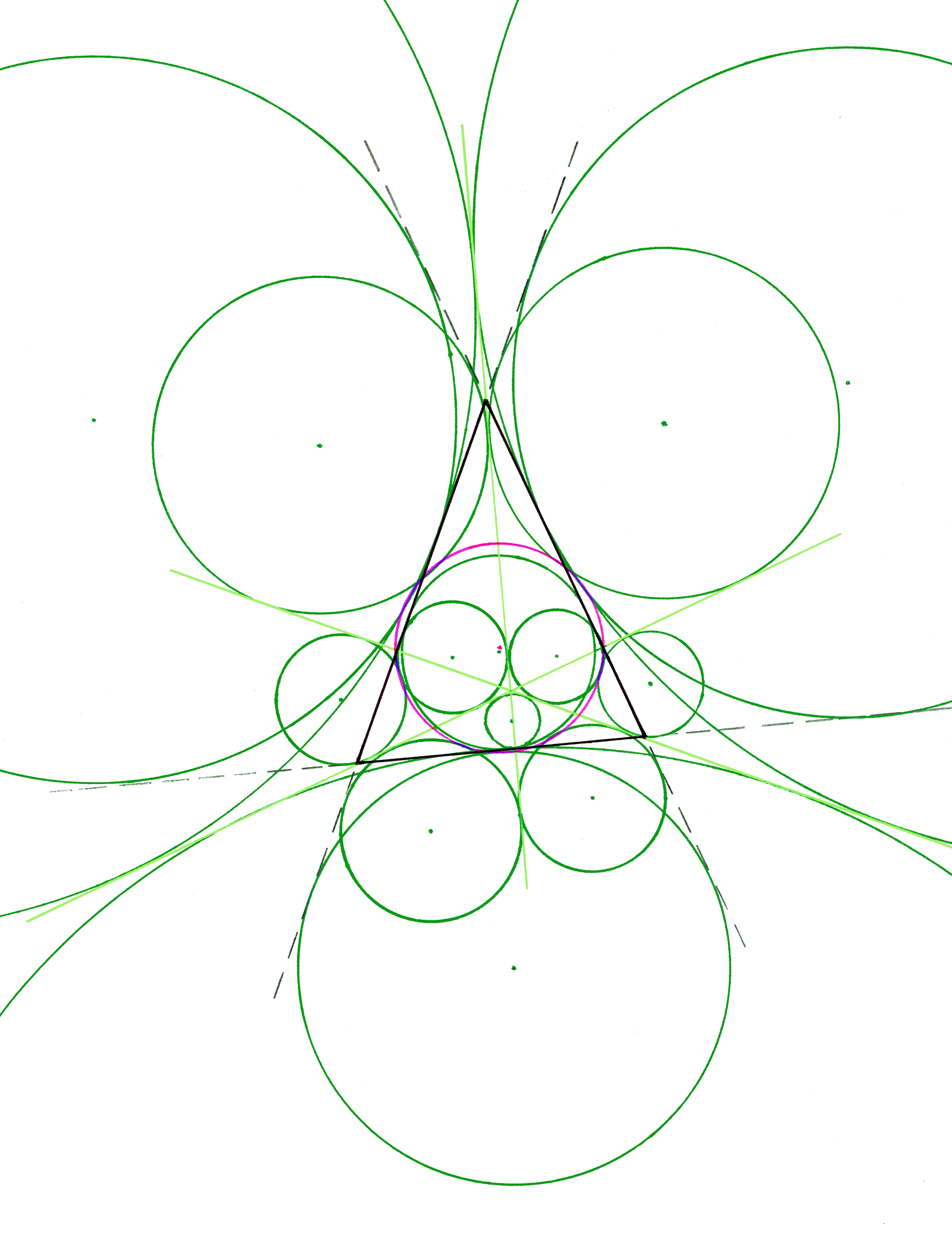
  The nine point circle and the 16 tangent circles of the orthocentric system
- If an orthocentric system of four points A, B, C, H is given, then the four triangles formed by any combination of three distinct points of that system all share the same nine-point circle. This is a consequence of symmetry: the sides of one triangle adjacent to a vertex that is an orthocenter to another triangle are segments from that second triangle. A third midpoint lies on their common side. (The same 'midpoints' defining separate nine-point circles, those circles must be concurrent.)
- Consequently, these four triangles have circumcircles with identical radii. Let N represent the common nine-point center and P be an arbitrary point in the plane of the orthocentric system. Then
  $$\overline{NA}^2 + \overline{NB}^2 + \overline{NC}^2 + \overline{NH}^2 = 3R^2$$
  where R is the common circumradius; and if
  $$\overline{PA}^2 + \overline{PB}^2 + \overline{PC}^2 + \overline{PH}^2 = K^2,$$
  where K is kept constant, then the locus of P is a circle centered at N with a radius $\tfrac{1}{2} \sqrt{K^2-3R^2}.$ As P approaches N the locus of P for the corresponding constant K, collapses onto N the nine-point center. Furthermore the nine-point circle is the locus of P such that
  $$\overline{PA}^2 + \overline{PB}^2 + \overline{PC}^2 + \overline{PH}^2 = 4R^2.$$
- The centers of the incircle and excircles of a triangle form an orthocentric system. The nine-point circle created for that orthocentric system is the circumcircle of the original triangle. The feet of the altitudes in the orthocentric system are the vertices of the original triangle.
- If four arbitrary points A, B, C, D are given that do not form an orthocentric system, then the nine-point circles of △ABC, △BCD, △CDA, △DAB concur at a point, the Poncelet point of A, B, C, D. The remaining six intersection points of these nine-point circles each concur with the midpoints of the four triangles. Remarkably, there exists a unique nine-point conic, centered at the centroid of these four arbitrary points, that passes through all seven points of intersection of these nine-point circles. Furthermore, because of the Feuerbach conic theorem mentioned above, there exists a unique rectangular circumconic, centered at the common intersection point of the four nine-point circles, that passes through the four original arbitrary points as well as the orthocenters of the four triangles.
- If four points A, B, C, D are given that form a cyclic quadrilateral, then the nine-point circles of △ABC, △BCD, △CDA, △DAB concur at the anticenter of the cyclic quadrilateral. The nine-point circles are all congruent with a radius of half that of the cyclic quadrilateral's circumcircle. The nine-point circles form a set of four Johnson circles. Consequently, the four nine-point centers are cyclic and lie on a circle congruent to the four nine-point circles that is centered at the anticenter of the cyclic quadrilateral. Furthermore, the cyclic quadrilateral formed from the four nine-pont centers is homothetic to the reference cyclic quadrilateral ABCD by a factor of –1/2 and its homothetic center N lies on the line connecting the circumcenter O to the anticenter M where
  $$\overline{ON} = 2\overline{NM}.$$
- The orthopole of lines passing through the circumcenter lie on the nine-point circle.
- A triangle's circumcircle, its nine-point circle, its polar circle, and the circumcircle of its tangential triangle are coaxal.
- Trilinear coordinates for the center of the Kiepert hyperbola are
  $$\frac{(b^2 -c^2)^2}{a} : \frac{(c^2-a^2)^2}{b} : \frac{(a^2-b^2)^2}{c}$$
- Trilinear coordinates for the center of the Jeřábek hyperbola are
  $$\cos(A)\sin^2(B-C) : \cos(B)\sin^2(C-A) : \cos(C)\sin^2(A-B)$$
- Letting x : y : z be a variable point in trilinear coordinates, an equation for the nine-point circle is
  $$x^2\sin 2A + y^2\sin 2B + z^2\sin 2C-2(yz\sin A + zx\sin B + xy\sin C) = 0.$$

== Generalization ==
The circle is an instance of a conic section and the nine-point circle is an instance of the general nine-point conic that has been constructed with relation to a triangle △ABC and a fourth point P, where the particular nine-point circle instance arises when P is the orthocenter of △ABC. The vertices of the triangle and P determine a complete quadrilateral and three "diagonal points" where opposite sides of the quadrilateral intersect. There are six "sidelines" in the quadrilateral; the nine-point conic intersects the midpoints of these and also includes the diagonal points. The conic is an ellipse when P is interior to △ABC or in a region sharing vertical angles with the triangle, but a nine-point hyperbola occurs when P is in one of the three adjacent regions, and the hyperbola is rectangular when P lies on the circumcircle of △ABC.

== See also ==
- Hart circle, a related construction for circular triangles
- Lester's theorem
- Poncelet point
- Synthetic geometry
- Euler line
