= Orthocenter =

Intersection of triangle altitudes

The three altitudes of a triangle intersect at the orthocenter, which for an acute triangle is inside the triangle.

The orthocenter of a triangle, usually denoted by H, is the point where the three (possibly extended) altitudes intersect. The orthocenter lies inside the triangle if and only if the triangle is acute. For a right triangle, the orthocenter coincides with the vertex at the right angle. For an equilateral triangle, all triangle centers (including the orthocenter) coincide at its centroid.

== Formulation ==
Let A, B, C denote the vertices and also the angles of the triangle, and let $a = \left|\overline{BC}\right|,$ $b = \left|\overline{CA}\right|,$ $c = \left|\overline{AB}\right|$ be the side lengths. The orthocenter has trilinear coordinates
$$\begin{align}
& \sec A:\sec B:\sec C \\
&= \cos A-\sin B \sin C:\cos B-\sin C \sin A:\cos C-\sin A\sin B,
\end{align}$$
and barycentric coordinates
$$\begin{align}
& (a^2+b^2-c^2)(a^2-b^2+c^2) : (a^2+b^2-c^2)(-a^2+b^2+c^2) : (a^2-b^2+c^2)(-a^2+b^2+c^2) \\
&= \tan A:\tan B:\tan C.
\end{align}$$

Since barycentric coordinates are all positive for a point in a triangle's interior but at least one is negative for a point in the exterior, and two of the barycentric coordinates are zero for a vertex point, the barycentric coordinates given for the orthocenter show that the orthocenter is in an acute triangle's interior, on the right-angled vertex of a right triangle, and exterior to an obtuse triangle.

In the complex plane, let the points A, B, C represent the numbers z_{A}, z_{B}, z_{C} and assume that the circumcenter of triangle △ABC is located at the origin of the plane. Then, the complex number
$$z_H=z_A+z_B+z_C$$
is represented by the point H, namely the orthocenter of triangle △ABC. From this, the following characterizations of the orthocenter H by means of free vectors can be established straightforwardly:
$$\vec{OH}=\sum\limits_{\scriptstyle\rm cyclic}\vec{OA},\qquad2\cdot\vec{HO}=\sum\limits_{\scriptstyle\rm cyclic}\vec{HA}.$$

The first of the previous vector identities is also known as the problem of Sylvester, proposed by James Joseph Sylvester.

== Properties ==
Let D, E, F denote the feet of the altitudes from A, B, C respectively. Then:

- The product of the lengths of the segments that the orthocenter divides an altitude into is the same for all three altitudes:
  $$\overline{AH} \cdot \overline{HD} = \overline{BH} \cdot \overline{HE} = \overline{CH} \cdot \overline{HF}.$$
  The circle centered at H having radius the square root of this constant is the triangle's polar circle.
- The sum of the ratios on the three altitudes of the distance of the orthocenter from the base to the length of the altitude is 1: (This property and the next one are applications of a more general property of any interior point and the three cevians through it.)
  $$\frac{\overline{HD}}{\overline{AD}} + \frac{\overline{HE}}{\overline{BE}} + \frac{\overline{HF}}{\overline{CF}} = 1.$$
- The sum of the ratios on the three altitudes of the distance of the orthocenter from the vertex to the length of the altitude is 2:
  $$\frac{\overline{AH}}{\overline{AD}} + \frac{\overline{BH}}{\overline{BE}} + \frac{\overline{CH}}{\overline{CF}} = 2.$$
- The isogonal conjugate of the orthocenter is the circumcenter of the triangle.
- The isotomic conjugate of the orthocenter is the symmedian point of the anticomplementary triangle.
- Four points in the plane, such that one of them is the orthocenter of the triangle formed by the other three, is called an orthocentric system or orthocentric quadrangle.

== Orthocentric system ==
Orthocentric system. Any point is the orthocenter of the triangle formed by the other three.

In geometry, an orthocentric system is a set of four points on a plane, one of which is the orthocenter of the triangle formed by the other three. Equivalently, the lines passing through disjoint pairs among the points are perpendicular, and the four circles passing through any three of the four points have the same radius.

If four points form an orthocentric system, then each of the four points is the orthocenter of the other three. These four possible triangles will all have the same nine-point circle. Consequently these four possible triangles must all have circumcircles with the same circumradius.

== Relation with circles and conics ==
Denote the circumradius of the triangle by R. Then
$$a^2 + b^2 + c^2 + \overline{AH}^2 + \overline{BH}^2 + \overline{CH}^2 = 12R^2.$$

In addition, denoting r as the radius of the triangle's incircle, r_{a}, r_{b}, r_{c} as the radii of its excircles, and R again as the radius of its circumcircle, the following relations hold regarding the distances of the orthocenter from the vertices:
$$\begin{align}
& r_a + r_b + r_c + r = \overline{AH} + \overline{BH} + \overline{CH} + 2R, \\
& r_a^2 + r_b^2 + r_c^2 + r^2 = \overline{AH}^2 + \overline{BH}^2 + \overline{CH}^2 + (2R)^2.
\end{align}$$

If any altitude, for example, A̅D̅, is extended to intersect the circumcircle at P, so that A̅D̅ is a chord of the circumcircle, then the foot D bisects segment H̅P̅:
$$\overline{HD} = \overline{DP}.$$

The directrices of all parabolas that are externally tangent to one side of a triangle and tangent to the extensions of the other sides pass through the orthocenter.

A circumconic passing through the orthocenter of a triangle is a rectangular hyperbola.

== Relation to other centers, the nine-point circle ==
The orthocenter H, the centroid G, the circumcenter O, and the center N of the nine-point circle all lie on a single line, known as the Euler line. The center of the nine-point circle lies at the midpoint of the Euler line, between the orthocenter and the circumcenter, and the distance between the centroid and the circumcenter is half of that between the centroid and the orthocenter:
$$\begin{align}
& \overline{OH} = 2\overline{NH}, \\
& 2\overline{OG} = \overline{GH}.
\end{align}$$

The orthocenter is closer to the incenter I than it is to the centroid, and the orthocenter is farther than the incenter is from the centroid:
$$\begin{align}
\overline{HI} &< \overline{HG}, \\
\overline{HG} &> \overline{IG}.
\end{align}$$

In terms of the sides a, b, c, inradius r and circumradius R,
$$\begin{align}
\overline{OH}^2 &= R^2 -8R^2 \cos A \cos B \cos C \\
&= 9R^2-(a^2+b^2+c^2), \\
\overline{HI}^2 &= 2r^2 -4R^2 \cos A \cos B \cos C.
\end{align}$$

== Orthic triangle ==
Triangle △abc (respectively, △DEF in the text) is the orthic triangle of triangle △ABC

If the triangle △ABC is oblique (does not contain a right-angle), the pedal triangle of the orthocenter of the original triangle is called the orthic triangle or altitude triangle. That is, the feet of the altitudes of an oblique triangle form the orthic triangle, △DEF. Also, the incenter (the center of the inscribed circle) of the orthic triangle △DEF is the orthocenter of the original triangle △ABC.

Trilinear coordinates for the vertices of the orthic triangle are given by
$$\begin{array}{rccccc}
D =& 0 &:& \sec B &:& \sec C \\
E =& \sec A &:& 0 &:& \sec C \\
F =& \sec A &:& \sec B &:& 0
\end{array}$$

The extended sides of the orthic triangle meet the opposite extended sides of its reference triangle at three collinear points.

In any acute triangle, the inscribed triangle with the smallest perimeter is the orthic triangle. This is the solution to Fagnano's problem, posed in 1775. The sides of the orthic triangle are parallel to the tangents to the circumcircle at the original triangle's vertices.

The orthic triangle of an acute triangle gives a triangular light route.

The tangent lines of the nine-point circle at the midpoints of the sides of △ABC are parallel to the sides of the orthic triangle, forming a triangle similar to the orthic triangle.

The orthic triangle is closely related to the tangential triangle, constructed as follows: let L_{A} be the line tangent to the circumcircle of triangle △ABC at vertex A, and define L_{B}, L_{C} analogously. Let $A'' = L_B \cap L_C,$ $B'' = L_C \cap L_A,$ $C'' = L_C \cap L_A.$ The tangential triangle is △A"B"C", whose sides are the tangents to triangle △ABC's circumcircle at its vertices; it is homothetic to the orthic triangle. The circumcenter of the tangential triangle, and the center of similitude of the orthic and tangential triangles, are on the Euler line.

Trilinear coordinates for the vertices of the tangential triangle are given by
$$\begin{array}{rrcrcr}
A'' =& -a &:& b &:& c \\
B'' =& a &:& -b &:& c \\
C'' =& a &:& b &:& -c
\end{array}$$
The reference triangle and its orthic triangle are orthologic triangles.

For more information on the orthic triangle, see here.

== History ==
The theorem that the three altitudes of a triangle concur (at the orthocenter) is not directly stated in surviving Greek mathematical texts, but is used in the Book of Lemmas (proposition 5), attributed to Archimedes (3rd century BC), citing the "commentary to the treatise about right-angled triangles", a work which does not survive. It was also mentioned by Pappus (Mathematical Collection, VII, 62; c. 340). The theorem was stated and proved explicitly by al-Nasawi in his (11th century) commentary on the Book of Lemmas, and attributed to al-Quhi (fl. 10th century).

This proof in Arabic was translated as part of the (early 17th century) Latin editions of the Book of Lemmas, but was not widely known in Europe, and the theorem was therefore proven several more times in the 17th–19th century. Samuel Marolois proved it in his Geometrie (1619), and Isaac Newton proved it in an unfinished treatise Geometry of Curved Lines (c. 1680). Later William Chapple proved it in 1749.

A particularly elegant proof is due to François-Joseph Servois (1804) and independently Carl Friedrich Gauss (1810): Draw a line parallel to each side of the triangle through the opposite point, and form a new triangle from the intersections of these three lines. Then the original triangle is the medial triangle of the new triangle, and the altitudes of the original triangle are the perpendicular bisectors of the new triangle, and therefore concur (at the circumcenter of the new triangle).

== See also ==
- Triangle center
