= Incircle and excircles =

Circles tangent to all three sides of a triangle

Incircle and excircles of a triangle. Extended sides of triangle △ABC Incircle (incenter at I) Excircles (excenters at J_{A}, J_{B}, J_{C}) Internal angle bisectors External angle bisectors (forming the excentral triangle)

In geometry, the incircle or inscribed circle of a triangle is the largest circle that can be contained in the triangle; it touches (is tangent to) the three sides. The center of the incircle is a triangle center called the triangle's incenter.

An excircle or escribed circle of the triangle is a circle lying outside the triangle, tangent to one of its sides and tangent to the extensions of the other two. Every triangle has three distinct excircles, each tangent to one of the triangle's sides.

The center of the incircle, called the incenter, can be found as the intersection of the three internal angle bisectors. The center of an excircle is the intersection of the internal bisector of one angle (at vertex A, for example) and the external bisectors of the other two. The center of this excircle is called the excenter relative to the vertex A, or the excenter of A. Because the internal bisector of an angle is perpendicular to its external bisector, it follows that the center of the incircle together with the three excircle centers form an orthocentric system.

== Incircle and Incenter ==
Suppose $\triangle ABC$ has an incircle with radius $r$ and center $I$. Let $a$ be the length of $\overline{BC}$, $b$ the length of $\overline{AC}$, and $c$ the length of $\overline{AB}$.

Also let $T_A$, $T_B$, and $T_C$ be the touchpoints where the incircle touches $\overline{BC}$, $\overline{AC}$, and $\overline{AB}$.

=== Incenter ===
The incenter is the point where the internal angle bisectors of $\angle ABC,$ $\angle BCA,$ and $\angle BAC$ meet.

==== Trilinear coordinates ====
The trilinear coordinates for a point in the triangle is the ratio of all the distances to the triangle sides. Because the incenter is the same distance from all sides of the triangle, the trilinear coordinates for the incenter are
$$\ 1 : 1 : 1.$$

==== Barycentric coordinates ====
The barycentric coordinates for a point in a triangle give weights such that the point is the weighted average of the triangle vertex positions. Barycentric coordinates for the incenter are given by
$$a : b : c$$
where $a$, $b$, and $c$ are the lengths of the sides of the triangle, or equivalently (using the law of sines) by
$$\sin A : \sin B : \sin C$$
where $A$, $B$, and $C$ are the angles at the three vertices.

==== Cartesian coordinates ====
The Cartesian coordinates of the incenter are a weighted average of the coordinates of the three vertices using the side lengths of the triangle relative to the perimeter (that is, using the barycentric coordinates given above, normalized to sum to unity) as weights. The weights are positive so the incenter lies inside the triangle as stated above. If the three vertices are located at $(x_a,y_a)$, $(x_b,y_b)$, and $(x_c,y_c)$, and the sides opposite these vertices have corresponding lengths $a$, $b$, and $c$, then the incenter is at
$$\left(\frac{a x_a + b x_b + c x_c}{a + b + c}, \frac{a y_a + b y_b + c y_c}{a + b + c}\right)
= \frac{a\left(x_a, y_a\right) + b\left(x_b, y_b\right) + c\left(x_c, y_c\right)}{a + b + c}.$$

==== Distances to the vertices ====
Denote the incenter of $\triangle ABC$ as $I$.

The distance from vertex $A$ to the incenter $I$ is:
$$\overline{AI} = d(A, I)
= c \, \frac{\sin\frac{B}{2}}{\cos\frac{C}{2}}
= b \, \frac{\sin\frac{C}{2}}{\cos\frac{B}{2}}.$$

==== Derivation of the formula stated above ====
Use the Law of sines in the triangle $\triangle IAB$.

We get $\frac{\overline{AI}}{\sin \frac{B}{2}} = \frac{c}{\sin \angle AIB}$. We have that $\angle AIB = \pi - \frac{A}{2} - \frac{B}{2} = \frac{\pi}{2} + \frac{C}{2}$.

It follows that $\overline{AI} = c \ \frac{\sin \frac{B}{2}}{\cos \frac{C}{2}}$.

The equality with the second expression is obtained the same way.

The distances from the incenter to the vertices combined with the lengths of the triangle sides obey the equation
$$\frac{\overline{IA} \cdot \overline{IA}}{\overline{CA} \cdot \overline{AB}} + \frac{\overline{IB} \cdot \overline{IB}}{\overline{AB} \cdot \overline{BC}} + \frac{\overline{IC} \cdot \overline{IC}}{\overline{BC} \cdot \overline{CA}} = 1.$$

Additionally,
$$\overline{IA} \cdot \overline{IB} \cdot \overline{IC} = 4Rr^2,$$
where $R$ and $r$ are the triangle's circumradius and inradius respectively.

==== Other properties ====
The collection of triangle centers may be given the structure of a group under coordinate-wise multiplication of trilinear coordinates; in this group, the incenter forms the identity element.

=== Incircle and its radius properties ===
==== Distances between vertex and nearest touchpoints ====
The distances from a vertex to the two nearest touchpoints are equal; for example from vertex $A$:
$$d\left(A, T_B\right) = d\left(A, T_C\right) = \tfrac12(b + c - a) = s - a,$$
where $s = \tfrac12(a + b + c)$ is the semiperimeter.

Similarly, the tangency points of the incircle divide the sides into segments of lengths $s-b$ from $B$, and $s-c$ from $C$ (see Tangent lines to a circle).

==== Radius ====
The radius of a triangle's incircle is called the inradius. For a triangle with sides of length $a$, $b$, $c$, the inradius is given by
$$r = \sqrt{\frac{(s-a)(s-b)(s-c)}{s}},$$
where $s = \tfrac12(a + b + c)$ is the semiperimeter (see Heron's formula).

==== Relation to area of the triangle ====
The radius of the incircle is related to the area of the triangle. The ratio of the area of the incircle to the area of the triangle is less than or equal to $\pi \big/ 3\sqrt3$, with equality holding only for equilateral triangles.

Proof without words that the area of a triangle equals the product of its inradius and its semiperimeter

Suppose $\triangle ABC$ has an incircle with radius $r$ and center $I$. Let $a$ be the length of $\overline{BC}$, $b$ the length of $\overline{AC}$, and $c$ the length of $\overline{AB}$.

Now, the incircle is tangent to $\overline{AB}$ at some point $T_C$, and so $\angle AT_CI$ is right. Thus, the radius $T_CI$ is an altitude of $\triangle IAB$.

Therefore, $\triangle IAB$ has base length $c$ and height $r$, and so has area $\tfrac12 cr$.

Similarly, $\triangle IAC$ has area $\tfrac12 br$ and $\triangle IBC$ has area $\tfrac12 ar$.

Since these three triangles decompose $\triangle ABC$, we see that the area $\Delta$ of $\triangle ABC$ is:
$$\Delta = \tfrac12 (a + b + c)r = sr,$$
and
$$r = \frac{\Delta}{s},$$
where $\Delta$ is the area of $\triangle ABC$ and $s = \tfrac12(a + b + c)$ is its semiperimeter.

For an alternative formula, consider $\triangle IT_CA$. This is a right-angled triangle with one side equal to $r$ and the other side equal to $r \cot \tfrac{A}{2}$. The same is true for $\triangle IB'A$. The large triangle is composed of six such triangles and the total area is:
$$\Delta = r^2 \left(\cot\tfrac{A}{2} + \cot\tfrac{B}{2} + \cot\tfrac{C}{2}\right).$$

==== Other properties ====
If the altitudes from sides of lengths $a$, $b$, and $c$ are $h_a$, $h_b$, and $h_c$, then the inradius $r$ is one third the harmonic mean of these altitudes; that is,
$$r = \frac{1}{\dfrac{1}{h_a} + \dfrac{1}{h_b} + \dfrac{1}{h_c}}.$$

The product of the incircle radius $r$ and the circumcircle radius $R$ of a triangle with sides $a$, $b$, and $c$ is
$$rR = \frac{abc}{2(a + b + c)}.$$

Some relations among the sides, incircle radius, and circumcircle radius are:
$$\begin{align}
ab + bc + ca &=  s^2 +  (4R + r)r, \\
a^2 + b^2 + c^2 &= 2s^2 - 2(4R + r)r.
\end{align}$$

Any line through a triangle that splits both the triangle's area and its perimeter in half goes through the triangle's incenter (the center of its incircle). There are either one, two, or three of these for any given triangle.

The incircle radius is no greater than one-ninth the sum of the altitudes.

The squared distance from the incenter $I$ to the circumcenter $O$ is given by
$$\overline{OI}^2 = R(R - 2r) = \frac{a\,b\,c\,}{a+b+c}\left [\frac{a\,b\,c\,}{(a+b-c)\,(a-b+c)\,(-a+b+c)}-1 \right ]$$
and the distance from the incenter to the center $N$ of the nine point circle is
$$\overline{IN} = \tfrac12(R - 2r) < \tfrac12 R.$$

The incenter lies in the medial triangle (whose vertices are the midpoints of the sides).

=== Gergonne triangle and point ===
Triangle △ABC Incircle (incenter at I) Contact triangle △T_{A}T_{B}T_{C} Lines between opposite vertices of △ABC and △T_{A}T_{B}T_{C} (concur at Gergonne point G_{e})

The Gergonne triangle (of $\triangle ABC$) is defined by connecting the three touchpoints of the incircle on the three sides. The touchpoint opposite $A$ is denoted $T_A$, etc.

This Gergonne triangle, $\triangle T_AT_BT_C$, is also known as the contact triangle or intouch triangle of $\triangle ABC$. Its area is
$$K_T = K\frac{2r^2 s}{abc}$$
where $K$, $r$, and $s$ are the area, radius of the incircle, and semiperimeter of the original triangle, and $a$, $b$, and $c$ are the side lengths of the original triangle. This is the same area as that of the extouch triangle.

The three lines $AT_A$, $BT_B$, and $CT_C$ intersect in a single point called the Gergonne point, denoted as $G_e$ (or triangle center X_{7}). The Gergonne point lies in the open orthocentroidal disk punctured at its own center, and can be any point therein.

The Gergonne point of a triangle has a number of properties, including that it is the symmedian point of the Gergonne triangle.

Trilinear coordinates for the vertices of the intouch triangle are given by
$$\begin{array}{rccccc}
T_A =& 0 &:& \sec^2 \frac{B}{2} &:& \sec^2\frac{C}{2} \\[2pt]
T_B =& \sec^2 \frac{A}{2} &:& 0 &:& \sec^2\frac{C}{2} \\[2pt]
T_C =& \sec^2 \frac{A}{2} &:& \sec^2\frac{B}{2} &:& 0.
\end{array}$$

Trilinear coordinates for the Gergonne point are given by
$$\sec^2\tfrac{A}{2} : \sec^2\tfrac{B}{2} : \sec^2\tfrac{C}{2},$$
or, equivalently, by the law of cosines,
$$\frac{bc}{b + c - a} : \frac{ca}{c + a - b} : \frac{ab}{a + b - c}.$$

== Excircles and excenters ==
Extended sides of △ABC Incircle (incenter at I) Excircles (excenters at J_{A}, J_{B}, J_{C}) Internal angle bisectors External angle bisectors (forming the excentral triangle)

An excircle or escribed circle of the triangle is a circle lying outside the triangle, tangent to one of its sides, and tangent to the extensions of the other two. Every triangle has three distinct excircles, each tangent to one of the triangle's sides.

The center of an excircle is the intersection of the internal bisector of one angle (at vertex $A$, for example) and the external bisectors of the other two. The center of this excircle is called the excenter relative to the vertex $A$, or the excenter of $A$. Because the internal bisector of an angle is perpendicular to its external bisector, it follows that the center of the incircle together with the three excircle centers form an orthocentric system.

=== Trilinear coordinates of excenters ===
While the incenter of $\triangle ABC$ has trilinear coordinates $1 : 1 : 1$, the excenters have trilinears
$$\begin{array}{rrcrcr}
J_A = & -1 &:& 1 &:& 1 \\
J_B = & 1 &:& -1 &:& 1 \\
J_C = & 1 &:& 1 &:& -1
\end{array}$$

=== Exradii ===
The radii of the excircles are called the exradii.

The exradius of the excircle opposite $A$ (so touching $BC$, centered at $J_A$) is
$$r_a = \frac{rs}{s - a} = \sqrt{\frac{s(s - b)(s - c)}{s - a}},$$
where $s = \tfrac{1}{2}(a + b + c).$

See Heron's formula.

==== Derivation of exradii formula ====
Let the excircle at side $AB$ touch at side $AC$ extended at $G$, and let this excircle's radius be $r_c$ and its center be $J_c$. Then $J_c G$ is an altitude of $\triangle ACJ_c$, so $\triangle ACJ_c$ has area $\tfrac12 br_c$. By a similar argument, $\triangle BCJ_c$ has area $\tfrac12 ar_c$ and $\triangle ABJ_c$ has area $\tfrac12 cr_c$. Thus the area $\Delta$ of triangle $\triangle ABC$ is
$$\Delta = \tfrac12 (a + b - c)r_c = (s - c)r_c.$$

So, by symmetry, denoting $r$ as the radius of the incircle,
$$\Delta = sr = (s - a)r_a = (s - b)r_b = (s - c)r_c.$$

By the Law of Cosines, we have
$$\cos A = \frac{b^2 + c^2 - a^2}{2bc}$$

Combining this with the identity $\sin^2 \! A + \cos^2 \! A = 1$, we have
$$\sin A = \frac{\sqrt{-a^4 - b^4 - c^4 + 2a^2 b^2 + 2b^2 c^2 + 2 a^2 c^2}}{2bc}$$

But $\Delta = \tfrac12 bc \sin A$, and so
$$\begin{align}
\Delta &= \tfrac14 \sqrt{-a^4 - b^4 - c^4 + 2a^2b^2 + 2b^2 c^2 + 2 a^2 c^2} \\[5mu]
&= \tfrac14 \sqrt{(a + b + c)(-a + b + c)(a - b + c)(a + b - c)} \\[5mu]
& = \sqrt{s(s - a)(s - b)(s - c)},
\end{align}$$
which is Heron's formula.

Combining this with $sr = \Delta$, we have
$$r^2 = \frac{\Delta^2}{s^2} = \frac{(s - a)(s - b)(s - c)}{s}.$$

Similarly, $(s - a)r_a = \Delta$ gives
$$\begin{align}
&r_a^2 = \frac{s(s - b)(s - c)}{s - a} \\[4pt]
&\implies r_a = \sqrt{\frac{s(s - b)(s - c)}{s - a}}.
\end{align}$$

==== Other properties ====
From the formulas above one can see that the excircles are always larger than the incircle and that the largest excircle is the one tangent to the longest side and the smallest excircle is tangent to the shortest side. Further, combining these formulas yields:
$$\Delta = \sqrt{r r_a r_b r_c}.$$

=== Other excircle properties ===
The circular hull of the excircles is internally tangent to each of the excircles and is thus an Apollonius circle. The radius of this Apollonius circle is $\tfrac{r^2 + s^2}{4r}$ where $r$ is the incircle radius and $s$ is the semiperimeter of the triangle.

The following relations hold among the inradius $r$, the circumradius $R$, the semiperimeter $s$, and the excircle radii $r_a$, $r_b$, $r_c$:
$$\begin{align}
r_a + r_b + r_c &= 4R + r, \\
r_a r_b + r_b r_c + r_c r_a &= s^2, \\
r_a^2 + r_b^2 + r_c^2 &= \left(4R + r\right)^2 - 2s^2.
\end{align}$$

The circle through the centers of the three excircles has radius $2R$.

If $H$ is the orthocenter of $\triangle ABC$, then
$$\begin{align}
r_a + r_b + r_c + r &= \overline{AH} + \overline{BH} + \overline{CH} + 2R, \\
r_a^2 + r_b^2 + r_c^2 + r^2 &= \overline{AH}^2 + \overline{BH}^2 + \overline{CH}^2 + (2R)^2.
\end{align}$$

=== Nagel triangle and Nagel point ===
Extended sides of triangle △ABC Excircles of △ABC (tangent at T_{A}. T_{B}, T_{C}) Nagel/Extouch triangle △T_{A}T_{B}T_{C} Splitters: lines connecting opposite vertices of △ABC and △T_{A}T_{B}T_{C} (concur at Nagel point N)

The Nagel triangle or extouch triangle of $\triangle ABC$ is denoted by the vertices $T_A$, $T_B$, and $T_C$ that are the three points where the excircles touch the reference $\triangle ABC$ and where $T_A$ is opposite of $A$, etc. This $\triangle T_AT_BT_C$ is also known as the extouch triangle of $\triangle ABC$. The circumcircle of the extouch $\triangle T_AT_BT_C$ is called the Mandart circle (cf. Mandart inellipse).

The three line segments $\overline{AT_A}$, $\overline{BT_B}$ and $\overline{CT_C}$ are called the splitters of the triangle; they each bisect the perimeter of the triangle,
$$\overline{AB} + \overline{BT_A} = \overline{AC} + \overline{CT_A} = \frac{1}{2}\left( \overline{AB} + \overline{BC} + \overline{AC} \right).$$

The splitters intersect in a single point, the triangle's Nagel point $N_a$ (or triangle center X_{8}).

Trilinear coordinates for the vertices of the extouch triangle are given by
$$\begin{array}{rccccc}
T_A =& 0 &:& \csc^2\frac{B}{2} &:& \csc^2\frac{C}{2} \\[2pt]
T_B =& \csc^2\frac{A}{2} &:& 0 &:& \csc^2\frac{C}{2} \\[2pt]
T_C =& \csc^2\frac{A}{2} &:& \csc^2\frac{B}{2} &:& 0
\end{array}$$

Trilinear coordinates for the Nagel point are given by
$$\csc^2\tfrac{A}{2} : \csc^2\tfrac{B}{2} : \csc^2\tfrac{C}{2},$$

or, equivalently, by the Law of Sines,
$$\frac{b + c - a}{a} : \frac{c + a - b}{b} : \frac{a + b - c}{c}.$$

Barycentric coordinates for the Nagel point are therefore
$$b + c - a: c + a - b : a + b - c,$$
or equivalently
$$s - a: s - b : s - c.$$

The Nagel point is the isotomic conjugate of the Gergonne point.

== Related constructions ==
=== Nine-point circle and Feuerbach point ===
The nine-point circle is tangent to the incircle and excircles

In geometry, the nine-point circle is a circle that can be constructed for any given triangle. It is so named because it passes through nine significant concyclic points defined from the triangle. These nine points are:

- The midpoint of each side of the triangle
- The foot of each altitude
- The midpoint of the line segment from each vertex of the triangle to the orthocenter (where the three altitudes meet; these line segments lie on their respective altitudes).

In 1822, Karl Feuerbach discovered that any triangle's nine-point circle is externally tangent to that triangle's three excircles and internally tangent to its incircle; this result is known as Feuerbach's theorem. He proved that:

... the circle which passes through the feet of the altitudes of a triangle is tangent to all four circles which in turn are tangent to the three sides of the triangle ... (Feuerbach 1822)

The triangle center at which the incircle and the nine-point circle touch is called the Feuerbach point.

The incircle may be described as the pedal circle of the incenter. The locus of points whose pedal circles are tangent to the nine-point circle is known as the McCay cubic.

=== Incentral and excentral triangles ===
The points of intersection of the interior angle bisectors of $\triangle ABC$ with the segments $BC$, $CA$, and $AB$ are the vertices of the incentral triangle. Trilinear coordinates for the vertices of the incentral triangle $\triangle A'B'C'$ are given by
$$\begin{array}{rccccc}
A' =& 0 &:& 1 &:& 1 \\[2pt]
B' =& 1 &:& 0 &:& 1 \\[2pt]
C' =& 1 &:& 1 &:& 0
\end{array}$$

The excentral triangle of a reference triangle has vertices at the centers of the reference triangle's excircles. Its sides are on the external angle bisectors of the reference triangle (see figure at top of page). Trilinear coordinates for the vertices of the excentral triangle $\triangle J_AJ_BJ_C$ are given by
$$\begin{array}{rrcrcr}
J_A =& -1 &:& 1 &:& 1\\[2pt]
J_B =& 1 &:& -1 &:& 1 \\[2pt]
J_C =& 1 &:& 1 &:& -1
\end{array}$$

== Equations for four circles ==
Let $x:y:z$ be a variable point in trilinear coordinates, and let $u=\cos^2\left ( A/2 \right )$, $v=\cos^2\left ( B/2 \right )$, $w=\cos^2\left ( C/2 \right )$. The four circles described above are given equivalently by either of the two given equations:

- Incircle:
  $$\begin{align}
u^2 x^2 + v^2 y^2 + w^2 z^2 - 2vwyz - 2wuzx - 2uvxy &= 0 \\[4pt]
{\textstyle \pm\sqrt{x}\cos\tfrac{A}{2} \pm \sqrt{y\vphantom{t}}\cos\tfrac{B}{2} \pm \sqrt{z}\cos\tfrac{C}{2}} &= 0
\end{align}$$
- $A$-excircle:
  $$\begin{align}
u^2 x^2 + v^2 y^2 + w^2 z^2 - 2vwyz + 2wuzx + 2uvxy &= 0 \\[4pt]
{\textstyle \pm\sqrt{-x}\cos\tfrac{A}{2} \pm \sqrt{y\vphantom{t}}\cos\tfrac{B}{2} \pm \sqrt{z}\cos\tfrac{C}{2}} &= 0
\end{align}$$
- $B$-excircle:
  $$\begin{align}
u^2 x^2 + v^2 y^2 + w^2 z^2 + 2vwyz - 2wuzx + 2uvxy &= 0 \\[4pt]
{\textstyle \pm\sqrt{x}\cos\tfrac{A}{2} \pm \sqrt{-y\vphantom{t}}\cos\tfrac{B}{2} \pm \sqrt{z}\cos\tfrac{C}{2}} &= 0
\end{align}$$
- $C$-excircle:
  $$\begin{align}
u^2 x^2 + v^2 y^2 + w^2 z^2 + 2vwyz + 2wuzx - 2uvxy &= 0 \\[4pt]
{\textstyle \pm\sqrt{x}\cos\tfrac{A}{2} \pm \sqrt{y\vphantom{t}}\cos\tfrac{B}{2} \pm \sqrt{-z}\cos\tfrac{C}{2}} &= 0
\end{align}$$

== Euler's theorem ==
Euler's theorem states that in a triangle:
$$(R - r)^2 = d^2 + r^2,$$
where $R$ and $r$ are the circumradius and inradius respectively, and $d$ is the distance between the circumcenter and the incenter.

For excircles the equation is similar:
$$\left(R + r_\text{ex}\right)^2 = d_\text{ex}^2 + r_\text{ex}^2,$$
where $r_\text{ex}$ is the radius of one of the excircles, and $d_\text{ex}$ is the distance between the circumcenter and that excircle's center.

== Generalization to other polygons ==
The dashed edges show that the total length of even-numbered edges equal that of odd-numbered ones

Some (but not all) quadrilaterals have an incircle. These are called tangential quadrilaterals. Among their many properties, perhaps the most important is that their two pairs of opposite sides have equal sums. This is called the Pitot theorem.

More generally, a polygon with any number of sides that has an inscribed circle (that is, one that is tangent to each side) is called a tangential polygon.

== Generalization to topological triangles ==
If topological triangles are considered, it is still possible to define an inscribed circle. It is no longer described as tangent to all sides, since the topological triangle might not be differentiable everywhere. Rather, it is defined as a circle whose center has the same minimal distance to each side. It has been proven that all topological triangles have an inscribed circle.

== See also ==
- Circumcenter – Circle that passes through the vertices of a triangle
- Circumcircle – Circle that passes through the vertices of a triangle
- Circumconic and inconic – Conic section that passes through the vertices of a triangle or is tangent to its sides
- Circumgon – Geometric figure which circumscribes a circle
- Ex-tangential quadrilateral – Convex 4-sided polygon whose sidelines are all tangent to an outside circle
- Harcourt's theorem – Formula for the area of a triangle
- Incenter–excenter lemma – Theorem about inscribed and circumscribed circles
- Inscribed sphere – Sphere tangent to every face of a polyhedron
- Power of a point – Relative distance of a point from a circle
- Steiner inellipse – Unique ellipse tangent to all 3 midpoints of a given triangle's sides
- Tangential quadrilateral – Polygon whose four sides all touch a circle
- Triangle conic
