= Medial triangle =

Triangle with vertices at midpoints of another triangle's sides

The red triangle is the medial triangle of the black. The endpoints of the red triangle coincide with the midpoints of the black triangle.

In Euclidean geometry, the medial triangle or midpoint triangle of a triangle △ABC is the triangle with vertices at the midpoints of the triangle's sides AB, AC, and BC. It is the n = 3 case of the midpoint polygon of a polygon with n sides. The medial triangle is not the same thing as the median triangle, which is the triangle whose sides have the same lengths as the medians of △ABC.

Each side of the medial triangle is called a midsegment (or midline). In general, a midsegment of a triangle is a line segment which joins the midpoints of two sides of the triangle. It is parallel to the third side and has a length equal to half the length of the third side.

== Properties ==
M: circumcenter of △ABC, orthocenter of △DEF N: incenter of △ABC, Nagel point of △DEF S: centroid of △ABC and △DEF

The medial triangle can also be viewed as the image of triangle △ABC transformed by a homothety centered at the centroid with ratio -1/2. Thus, the sides of the medial triangle are half and parallel to the corresponding sides of △ABC. Hence, the medial triangle is inversely similar and shares the same centroid and medians with △ABC. It also follows from this that the perimeter of the medial triangle equals the semiperimeter of △ABC, and that the area is one quarter of the area of △ABC. Furthermore, the four triangles that the original triangle is subdivided into by the medial triangle are all mutually congruent by SSS, so their areas are equal and thus the area of each is 1/4 the area of the original triangle.

The orthocenter of the medial triangle coincides with the circumcenter of △ABC. This fact provides a tool for proving collinearity of the circumcenter, centroid and orthocenter. The medial triangle is the pedal triangle of the circumcenter. The nine-point circle circumscribes the medial triangle, and so the nine-point center is the circumcenter of the medial triangle.

The Nagel point of the medial triangle is the incenter of its reference triangle. In particular, this means that the incenter of a triangle must lie in its medial triangle.

The incenter of the medial triangle is the Spieker center of its reference triangle.

A reference triangle's medial triangle is congruent to the triangle whose vertices are the midpoints between the reference triangle's orthocenter and its vertices.

A point in the interior of a triangle is the center of an inellipse of the triangle if and only if the point lies in the interior of the medial triangle.

The medial triangle is the only inscribed triangle for which none of the other three interior triangles has smaller area.

The reference triangle and its medial triangle are orthologic triangles.

== Coordinates ==
Let a = |BC|, b = |CA|, c = |AB| be the sidelengths of triangle △ABC. Trilinear coordinates for the vertices of the medial triangle △EFD are given by:
$$\begin{array}{ccc}
E =& 0           &:& \frac{1}{b} &:& \frac{1}{c} \\[2pt]
F =& \frac{1}{a} &:& 0           &:& \frac{1}{c} \\[2pt]
D =& \frac{1}{a} &:& \frac{1}{b} &:& \, 0
\end{array}$$

== Anticomplementary triangle ==
If △EFD is the medial triangle of △ABC, then △ABC is the anticomplementary triangle or antimedial triangle of △EFD. The anticomplementary triangle of △ABC is formed by three lines parallel to the sides of △ABC: the parallel to AB through C, the parallel to AC through B, and the parallel to BC through A.

Trilinear coordinates for the vertices of the triangle $\triangle E'F'D'$ anticomplementary to $\triangle ABC$ are given by:
$$\begin{array}{crrr}
E' =& -\frac{1}{a} &:& \frac{1}{b} &:& \frac{1}{c} \\[2pt]
F' =& \frac{1}{a} &:& -\frac{1}{b} &:& \frac{1}{c} \\[2pt]
D' =& \frac{1}{a} &:& \frac{1}{b} &:& -\frac{1}{c}
\end{array}$$

The name "anticomplementary triangle" corresponds to the fact that its vertices are the anticomplements of the vertices A, B, and C of the reference triangle. The vertices of the medial triangle are the complements of A, B, and C.

== See also ==
- Middle hedgehog, an analogous concept for more general convex sets
