= Circumscribed circle =

Four cyclic polygons, each with a circle circumscribed about it

In geometry, a circumscribed circle for a set of points is a circle passing through each of them. Such a circle is said to circumscribe the points or a polygon formed from them; such a polygon is said to be inscribed in the circle.

- Circumcircle, the circumscribed circle of a triangle, which always exists for a given triangle.
- Cyclic polygon, a general polygon that can be circumscribed by a circle. The vertices of this polygon are concyclic points. All triangles are cyclic polygons.
- Cyclic quadrilateral, a special case of a cyclic polygon.

== See also ==
- Smallest-circle problem, the related problem of finding the circle with minimal radius containing an arbitrary set of points, not necessarily passing through them.
- Inscribed figure
