= Trilinear coordinates =

Coordinate system based on distances from a triangle's sidelines

In △ABC, a', b', c' are the actual distances from an interior point to the sidelines BC, CA, AB respectively.

In geometry, the trilinear coordinates x : y : z of a point relative to a given triangle describe the relative directed distances from the three sidelines of the triangle. Trilinear coordinates are an example of homogeneous coordinates. The ratio x : y is the ratio of the perpendicular distances from the point to the sides (extended if necessary) opposite vertices A and B respectively; the ratio y : z is the ratio of the perpendicular distances from the point to the sidelines opposite vertices B and C respectively; and likewise for z : x and vertices C and A.

In the diagram at right, the trilinear coordinates of the indicated interior point are the actual distances (a', b', c'), or equivalently in ratio form, ka' : kb' : kc' for any positive constant k. If a point is on a sideline of the reference triangle, its corresponding trilinear coordinate is 0. If an exterior point is on the opposite side of a sideline from the interior of the triangle, its trilinear coordinate associated with that sideline is negative. It is impossible for all three trilinear coordinates to be non-positive.

== Notation ==
The ratio notation $x : y : z$ for trilinear coordinates is often used in preference to the ordered triple notation $(x, y, z),$ with the latter reserved for triples of directed distances $(a', b', c')$ relative to a specific triangle. The trilinear coordinates $x : y : z,$ can be rescaled by any arbitrary value without affecting their ratio. The bracketed, comma-separated triple notation $(x, y, z)$ can cause confusion because conventionally this represents a different triple than e.g. $(2x, 2y, 2z),$ but these equivalent ratios $x : y : z = {}\!$$2x : 2y : 2z$ represent the same point.

== Examples ==
The trilinear coordinates of the incenter of a triangle △ABC are 1 : 1 : 1; that is, the (directed) distances from the incenter to the sidelines BC, CA, AB are proportional to the actual distances denoted by (r, r, r), where r is the inradius of △ABC. Given side lengths a, b, c we have:

Name; Symbol		Trilinear coordinates	Description
Vertices	A	$1 : 0 : 0$	Points at the corners of the triangle
Vertices	B	$0 : 1 : 0$	Points at the corners of the triangle
Vertices	C	$0 : 0 : 1$	Points at the corners of the triangle
Incenter	I	$1 : 1 : 1$	Intersection of the internal angle bisectors; Center of the triangle's inscribed circle
Excenters	I_{A}	$-1 : 1 : 1$	Intersections of the angle bisectors (two external, one internal); Centers of the triangle's three escribed circles
Excenters	I_{B}	$1 : -1 : 1$	Intersections of the angle bisectors (two external, one internal); Centers of the triangle's three escribed circles
Excenters	I_{C}	$1 : 1 : -1$	Intersections of the angle bisectors (two external, one internal); Centers of the triangle's three escribed circles
Centroid	G	$\frac1a : \frac1b : \frac1c$	Intersection of the medians; Center of mass of a uniform triangular lamina
Circumcenter	O	$\cos A : \cos B : \cos C$	Intersection of the perpendicular bisectors of the sides; Center of the triangle's circumscribed circle
Orthocenter	H	$\sec A : \sec B : \sec C$	Intersection of the altitudes
Nine-point center	N	$$\begin{align}&\cos(B-C) : \cos(C-A) \\ &\qquad : \cos(A-B)\end{align}$$	Center of the circle passing through the midpoint of each side, the foot of each altitude, and the midpoint between the orthocenter and each vertex
Symmedian point	K	$a : b : c$	Intersection of the symmedians – the reflection of each median about the corresponding angle bisector

Note that, in general, the incenter is not the same as the centroid; the centroid has barycentric coordinates 1 : 1 : 1 (these being proportional to actual signed areas of the triangles △BGC, △CGA, △AGB, where G = centroid.)

The midpoint of, for example, side BC has trilinear coordinates in actual sideline distances $(0 , \tfrac{\Delta}{b} , \tfrac{\Delta}{c})$ for triangle area Δ, which in arbitrarily specified relative distances simplifies to 0 : ca : ab. The coordinates in actual sideline distances of the foot of the altitude from A to BC are $(0, \tfrac{2\Delta}{a}\cos C, \tfrac{2\Delta}{a}\cos B),$ which in purely relative distances simplifies to 0 : cos C : cos B.

== Formulas ==
=== Collinearities and concurrencies ===
Trilinear coordinates enable many algebraic methods in triangle geometry. For example, three points
$$\begin{align}
P &= p:q:r \\
U &= u:v:w \\
X &= x:y:z \\
\end{align}$$
are collinear if and only if the determinant
$$D = \begin{vmatrix}
p & q & r \\
u & v & w \\
x & y & z
\end{vmatrix}$$
equals zero. Thus if x : y : z is a variable point, the equation of a line through the points P and U is D = 0. From this, every straight line has a linear equation homogeneous in x, y, z. Every equation of the form $lx+my+nz=0$ in real coefficients is a real straight line of finite points unless l : m : n is proportional to a : b : c, the side lengths, in which case we have the locus of points at infinity.

The dual of this proposition is that the lines
$$\begin{align}
p\alpha + q\beta + r\gamma &= 0 \\
u\alpha + v\beta + w\gamma &= 0 \\
x\alpha + y\beta + z\gamma &= 0
\end{align}$$
concur in a point (α, β, γ) if and only if D = 0.

Also, if the actual directed distances are used when evaluating the determinant of D, then the area of triangle △PUX is KD, where $K = \tfrac{-abc}{8\Delta^2}$ (and where Δ is the area of triangle △ABC, as above) if triangle △PUX has the same orientation (clockwise or counterclockwise) as △ABC, and $K = \tfrac{-abc}{8\Delta^2}$ otherwise.

=== Parallel lines ===
Two lines with trilinear equations $lx+my+nz=0$ and $l'x+m'y+n'z=0$ are parallel if and only if
$$\begin{vmatrix}
l  & m  & n \\
l' & m' & n' \\
a  & b  & c
\end{vmatrix}=0,$$
where a, b, c are the side lengths.

=== Angle between two lines ===
The tangents of the angles between two lines with trilinear equations $lx+my+nz=0$ and $l'x+m'y+n'z=0$ are given by
$$\pm \frac{(mn'-m'n)\sin A + (nl'-n'l)\sin B + (lm'-l'm)\sin C}{ll' + mm' + nn' - (mn'+m'n)\cos A -(nl'+n'l)\cos B - (lm'+l'm)\cos C}.$$

Thus they are perpendicular if
$$ll'+mm'+nn'-(mn'+m'n)\cos A-(nl'+n'l)\cos B-(lm'+l'm)\cos C=0.$$

=== Altitude ===
The equation of the altitude from vertex A to side BC is
$$y\cos B-z\cos C=0.$$

=== Line in terms of distances from vertices ===
The equation of a line with variable distances p, q, r from the vertices A, B, C whose opposite sides are a, b, c is
$$apx+bqy+crz=0.$$

=== Actual-distance trilinear coordinates ===
The trilinears with the coordinate values a', b', c' being the actual perpendicular distances to the sides satisfy
$$aa' +bb' + cc' =2\Delta$$
for triangle sides a, b, c and area Δ. This can be seen in the figure at the top of this article, with interior point P partitioning triangle △ABC into three triangles △PBC, △PCA, △PAB with respective areas $\tfrac{1}{2}aa' , \tfrac{1}{2}bb', \tfrac{1}{2}cc'.$

=== Distance between two points ===
The distance d between two points with actual-distance trilinears a_{i} : b_{i} : c_{i} is given by
$$d^2\sin ^2 C=(a_1-a_2)^2+(b_1-b_2)^2+2(a_1-a_2)(b_1-b_2)\cos C$$
or in a more symmetric way
$$d^2 = \frac{a b c}{4\Delta^2}\left(a(b_1-b_2)(c_2-c_1)+b(c_1-c_2)(a_2-a_1)+c(a_1-a_2)(b_2-b_1)\right).$$

=== Distance from a point to a line ===
The distance d from a point a' : b' : c' , in trilinear coordinates of actual distances, to a straight line $lx+my+nz=0$ is
$$d=\frac{la'+mb'+nc'}{\sqrt{l^2+m^2+n^2-2mn\cos A -2nl\cos B -2lm\cos C}}.$$

=== Quadratic curves ===
The equation of a conic section in the variable trilinear point x : y : z is
$$rx^2+sy^2+tz^2+2uyz+2vzx+2wxy=0.$$

It has no linear terms and no constant term.

The equation of a circle of radius r having center at actual-distance coordinates (a', b', c' ) is
$$(x-a')^2\sin 2A+(y-b')^2\sin 2B+(z-c')^2\sin 2C=2r^2\sin A\sin B\sin C.$$

==== Circumconics ====
The equation in trilinear coordinates x, y, z of any circumconic of a triangle is
$$lyz+mzx+nxy=0.$$

If the parameters l, m, n respectively equal the side lengths a, b, c (or the sines of the angles opposite them) then the equation gives the circumcircle.

Each distinct circumconic has a center unique to itself. The equation in trilinear coordinates of the circumconic with center x' : y' : z' is
$$yz(x'-y'-z')+zx(y'-z'-x')+xy(z'-x'-y')=0.$$

==== Inconics ====
Every conic section inscribed in a triangle has an equation in trilinear coordinates:
$$l^2x^2+m^2y^2+n^2z^2 \pm 2mnyz \pm 2nlzx\pm 2lmxy =0,$$
with exactly one or three of the unspecified signs being negative.

The equation of the incircle can be simplified to
$$\pm \sqrt{x}\cos \frac{A}{2}\pm \sqrt{y}\cos \frac{B}{2}\pm\sqrt{z}\cos \frac{C}{2}=0,$$
while the equation for, for example, the excircle adjacent to the side segment opposite vertex A can be written as
$$\pm \sqrt{-x}\cos \frac{A}{2}\pm \sqrt{y}\cos \frac{B}{2}\pm\sqrt{z}\cos \frac{C}{2}=0.$$

=== Cubic curves ===
Many cubic curves are easily represented using trilinear coordinates. For example, the pivotal self-isoconjugate cubic Z(U, P), as the locus of a point X such that the P-isoconjugate of X is on the line UX is given by the determinant equation
$$\begin{vmatrix}x&y&z\\
qryz&rpzx&pqxy\\
u&v&w\end{vmatrix} = 0.$$

Among named cubics Z(U, P) are the following:

- Thomson cubic: $Z(X(2),X(1))$, where $X(2)$ is centroid and $X(1)$ is incenter
- Feuerbach cubic: $Z(X(5),X(1))$, where $X(5)$ is Feuerbach point
- Darboux cubic: $Z(X(20),X(1))$, where $X(20)$ is De Longchamps point
- Neuberg cubic: $Z(X(30),X(1))$, where $X(30)$ is Euler infinity point.

== Conversions ==
=== Between trilinear coordinates and distances from sidelines ===
For any choice of trilinear coordinates x : y : z to locate a point, the actual distances of the point from the sidelines are given by a' = kx, b' = ky, c' = kz where k can be determined by the formula $k = \tfrac{2\Delta}{ax + by + cz}$ in which a, b, c are the respective sidelengths BC, CA, AB, and ∆ is the area of △ABC.

=== Between barycentric and trilinear coordinates ===
A point with trilinear coordinates x : y : z has barycentric coordinates ax : by : cz where a, b, c are the sidelengths of the triangle. Conversely, a point with barycentrics α : β : γ has trilinear coordinates $\tfrac{\alpha}{a} : \tfrac{\beta}{b} : \tfrac{\gamma}{c}.$

=== Between Cartesian and trilinear coordinates ===
Given a reference triangle △ABC, express the position of the vertex B in terms of an ordered pair of Cartesian coordinates and represent this algebraically as a vector $\vec B,$ using vertex C as the origin. Similarly define the position vector of vertex A as $\vec A.$ Then any point P associated with the reference triangle △ABC can be defined in a Cartesian system as a vector $\vec P = k_1\vec A + k_2\vec B.$ If this point P has trilinear coordinates x : y : z then the conversion formula from the coefficients k_{1} and k_{2} in the Cartesian representation to the trilinear coordinates is, for side lengths a, b, c opposite vertices A, B, C,
$$x:y:z = \frac{k_1}{a} : \frac{k_2}{b} : \frac{1 - k_1 - k_2}{c},$$
and the conversion formula from the trilinear coordinates to the coefficients in the Cartesian representation is
$$k_1 = \frac{ax}{ax + by + cz}, \quad k_2 = \frac{by}{ax + by + cz}.$$

More generally, if an arbitrary origin is chosen where the Cartesian coordinates of the vertices are known and represented by the vectors $\vec A, \vec B, \vec C$ and if the point P has trilinear coordinates x : y : z, then the Cartesian coordinates of $\vec P$ are the weighted average of the Cartesian coordinates of these vertices using the barycentric coordinates ax, by, cz as the weights. Hence the conversion formula from the trilinear coordinates x, y, z to the vector of Cartesian coordinates $\vec P$ of the point is given by
$$\vec{P}=\frac{ax}{ax+by+cz}\vec{A}+\frac{by}{ax+by+cz}\vec{B}+\frac{cz}{ax+by+cz}\vec{C},$$
where the side lengths are
$$\begin{align}
& \left|\vec C - \vec B\right| = a, \\
& \left|\vec A - \vec C\right| = b, \\
& \left|\vec B - \vec A\right| = c.
\end{align}$$

== See also ==
- Morley's triangles, giving examples of numerous points expressed in trilinear coordinates
- Ternary plot
- Viviani's theorem
