= Altitude (triangle) =

Perpendicular line segment from a triangle's side to opposite vertex

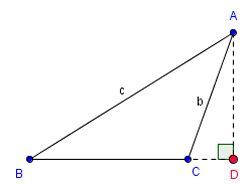
The altitude from A (dashed line segment) intersects the extended base at D (a point outside the triangle).

In geometry, an altitude of a triangle is a line segment through a given vertex (called apex) and perpendicular to a line containing the side or edge opposite the apex. This (finite) edge and (infinite) line extension are called, respectively, the base and extended base of the altitude. The point at the intersection of the extended base and the altitude is called the foot of the altitude. The length of the altitude, often simply called "the altitude" or "height", symbol h, is the distance between the foot and the apex. The process of drawing the altitude from a vertex to the foot is known as dropping the altitude at that vertex. It is a special case of orthogonal projection.

Altitudes can be used in the computation of the area of a triangle: one-half of the product of an altitude's length and its base's length (symbol b) equals the triangle's area: A=hb/2. Thus, the longest altitude is perpendicular to the shortest side of the triangle. The altitudes are also related to the sides of the triangle through the trigonometric functions.

In an isosceles triangle (a triangle with two congruent sides), the altitude having the incongruent side as its base will have the midpoint of that side as its foot. Also the altitude having the incongruent side as its base will be the angle bisector of the vertex angle.

In a right triangle, the altitude drawn to the hypotenuse c divides the hypotenuse into two segments of lengths p and q. If we denote the length of the altitude by h_{c}, we then have the relation

$h_c=\sqrt{pq}$ (geometric mean theorem; see special cases, inverse Pythagorean theorem)

In a right triangle, the altitude from each acute angle coincides with a leg and intersects the opposite side at (has its foot at) the right-angled vertex, which is the orthocenter.

For acute triangles, the feet of the altitudes all fall on the triangle's sides (not extended). In an obtuse triangle (one with an obtuse angle), the foot of the altitude to the obtuse-angled vertex falls in the interior of the opposite side, but the feet of the altitudes to the acute-angled vertices fall on the opposite extended side, exterior to the triangle. This is illustrated in the adjacent diagram: in this obtuse triangle, an altitude dropped perpendicularly from the top vertex, which has an acute angle, intersects the extended horizontal side outside the triangle.

== Theorems ==
The geometric altitude figures prominently in many important theorems and their proofs. For example, besides those theorems listed below, the altitude plays a central role in proofs of both the Law of sines and Law of cosines.

=== Orthocenter ===
The three altitudes of a triangle intersect at the orthocenter, which for an acute triangle is inside the triangle.

The orthocenter of a triangle, usually denoted by H, is the point where the three (possibly extended) altitudes intersect. The orthocenter lies inside the triangle if and only if the triangle is acute. For a right triangle, the orthocenter coincides with the vertex at the right angle. For an equilateral triangle, all triangle centers (including the orthocenter) coincide at its centroid.

=== Altitude in terms of the sides ===
For any triangle with sides a, b, c and semiperimeter $s = \tfrac12(a+b+c),$ the altitude from side a (the base) is given by

$$h_a=\frac{2\sqrt{s(s-a)(s-b)(s-c)}}{a}.$$

This follows from combining Heron's formula for the area of a triangle in terms of the sides with the area formula $\tfrac{1}{2} \times \text{base} \times \text{height},$ where the base is taken as side a and the height is the altitude from the vertex A (opposite side a).

By exchanging the a on the denominator with b or c, this equation can also used to find the altitudes h_{b} and h_{c}, respectively.

Any two altitudes of a triangle are inversely proportional with the sides on which they fall.

=== Inradius theorems ===
Consider an arbitrary triangle with sides a, b, c and with corresponding altitudes h_{a}, h_{b}, h_{c}. The altitudes and the incircle radius r are related by

$$\displaystyle \frac{1}{r}=\frac{1}{h_a}+\frac{1}{h_b}+\frac{1}{h_c}.$$

=== Circumradius theorem ===
Denoting the altitude from one side of a triangle as h_{a}, the other two sides as b and c, and the triangle's circumradius (radius of the triangle's circumscribed circle) as R, the altitude is given by

$$h_a=\frac{bc}{2R}.$$

=== Interior point ===
If p_{1}, p_{2}, p_{3} are the perpendicular distances from any point P to the sides, and h_{1}, h_{2}, h_{3} are the altitudes to the respective sides, then

$$\frac{p_1}{h_1} +\frac{p_2}{h_2} + \frac{p_3}{h_3} = 1.$$

=== Area theorem ===
Denoting the altitudes of any triangle from sides a, b, c respectively as h_{a}, h_{b}, h_{c}, and the semi-sum of the reciprocals of the altitudes as $\textstyle H = \tfrac12(h_a^{-1} + h_b^{-1} + h_c^{-1})$ then the reciprocal of area is

$$\mathrm{Area}^{-1} = 4 \sqrt{H(H-h_a^{-1})(H-h_b^{-1})(H-h_c^{-1})}.$$

=== General point on an altitude ===
If E is any point on an altitude A̅D̅ of any triangle △ABC, then

$$\overline{AC}^2 + \overline{EB}^2 = \overline{AB}^2 + \overline{CE}^2.$$

=== Triangle inequality ===
Since the area of the triangle is $\tfrac12 a h_a = \tfrac12 b h_b = \tfrac12 c h_c$, the triangle inequality $a < b+ c$ implies

$$\frac1{h_a} < \frac1{h_b}+ \frac1{h_c}$$.

=== Special cases ===
==== Equilateral triangle ====
From any point P within an equilateral triangle, the sum of the perpendiculars to the three sides is equal to the altitude of the triangle. This is Viviani's theorem.

==== Right triangle ====
The altitude of a right triangle from its right angle to its hypotenuse is the geometric mean of the lengths of the segments the hypotenuse is split into. Using Pythagoras' theorem on the 3 triangles of sides (p + q, r, s ), (r, p, h ) and (s, h, q ), $$\begin{align} (p + q)^2 \;\; &= \quad r^2 \;\;\, + \quad s^2 \\ p^2 \!\!+\! 2pq \!+\! q^2 &= \overbrace{p^2 \!\!+\! h^2} + \overbrace{h^2 \!\!+\! q^2} \\ 2pq \quad\;\;\; &= 2h^2 \; \therefore h \!=\! \sqrt{pq} \\ \end{align}$$

Comparison of the inverse Pythagorean theorem with the Pythagorean theorem

In a right triangle with legs a and b and hypotenuse c, each of the legs is also an altitude: $h_a = b$ and $h_b = a$. The third altitude can be found by the relation

$$\frac{1}{h_c ^2} = \frac{1}{h_a ^2}+\frac{1}{h_b ^2} = \frac{1}{a^2}+\frac{1}{b^2}.$$

This is also known as the inverse Pythagorean theorem.

Note in particular:

$$\begin{align}
\tfrac{1}{2} AC \cdot BC &= \tfrac{1}{2} AB \cdot CD \\[4pt]
CD &= \frac{AC \cdot BC}{AB} \\[4pt]
\end{align}$$

== See also ==
- Median (geometry)
