= Inellipse =

Ellipse tangent to all sides of a triangle

Example of an inellipse

In triangle geometry, an inellipse is an ellipse that touches the three sides of a triangle. The simplest example is the incircle. Further important inellipses are the Steiner inellipse, which touches the triangle at the midpoints of its sides, the Mandart inellipse and Brocard inellipse (see examples section). For any triangle there exist an infinite number of inellipses.

The Steiner inellipse plays a special role: Its area is the greatest of all inellipses.

Because a non-degenerate conic section is uniquely determined by five items out of the sets of vertices and tangents, in a triangle whose three sides are given as tangents one can specify only the points of contact on two sides. The third point of contact is then uniquely determined.

== Parametric representations, center, conjugate diameters ==
An inellipse of a triangle is uniquely determined by the vertices of the triangle and two points of contact $U,V$.

The inellipse of the triangle with vertices

$$O=(0,0), \; A=(a_1,a_2), \; B=(b_1,b_2)$$

and points of contact

$$U=(u_1,u_2) ,\; V=(v_1,v_2)$$

on $OA$ and $OB$ respectively can by described by the rational parametric representation

- $\left ( \frac{4u_1\xi^2+v_1ab}{4\xi^2+4\xi+ab},\frac{4u_2\xi^2+v_2ab}{4\xi^2+4\xi+ab}\right )\ , \ -\infty<\xi<\infty \ ,$

where $a,b$ are uniquely determined by the choice of the points of contact:

$$a=\frac{1}{s-1}, \ u_i=s a_i,\quad b=\frac{1}{t-1}, \ v_i=t b_i \; ,\ 0<s,t<1 \; .$$

The third point of contact is

$$W= \left ( \frac{u_1a+v_1b}{a+b+2}\; ,\; \frac{u_2a+v_2b}{a+b+2}\right ) \; .$$

The center of the inellipse is

$$M= \frac{ab}{ab-1}\left ( \frac{u_1+v_1}{2},\frac{u_2+v_2}{2}\right ) \; .$$

The vectors

$$\vec f_1=\frac{1}{2}\frac{\sqrt{ab}}{ab-1}\;(u_1+v_1,u_2+v_2)$$
$$\vec f_2=\frac{1}{2}\sqrt{\frac{ab}{ab-1}}\;(u_1-v_1,u_2-v_2)\;$$

are two conjugate half diameters and the inellipse has the more common trigonometric parametric representation

- $\vec x = \vec{OM}+\vec f_1\cos \varphi + \vec f_2\sin \varphi \; .$

Brianchon point $K$

The Brianchon point of the inellipse (common point $K$ of the lines $\overline{AV} , \overline{BU}, \overline{OW}$) is

$$K: \left ( \frac{u_1a+v_1b}{a+b+1}\; ,\; \frac{u_2a+v_2b}{a+b+1}\right) \ .$$

Varying $s,t$ is an easy option to prescribe the two points of contact $U,V$. The given bounds for $s,t$ guarantee that the points of contact are located on the sides of the triangle. They provide for $a,b$ the bounds $-\infty<a,b<-1$.

Remark: The parameters $a,b$ are neither the semiaxes of the inellipse nor the lengths of two sides.

== Examples ==
Mandart inellipse

=== Steiner inellipse ===
For $s=t=\tfrac 1 2$ the points of contact $U,V,W$ are the midpoints of the sides and the inellipse is the Steiner inellipse (its center is the triangle's centroid).

=== Incircle ===
For $s=\tfrac{|OA|+|OB|-|AB|}{2|OA|},\; t=\tfrac{|OA|+|OB|-|AB|}{2|OB|}$ one gets the incircle of the triangle with center

$$\vec{OM}=\frac{|OB|\vec{OA}+|OA|\vec{OB}}{|OA|+|OB|+|AB|}\; .$$

=== Mandart inellipse ===
For $s=\tfrac{|OA|-|OB|+|AB|}{2|OA|},\; t=\tfrac{-|OA|+|OB|+|AB|}{2|OB|}$ the inellipse is the Mandart inellipse of the triangle. It touches the sides at the points of contact of the excircles (see diagram).

Brocard inellipse

=== Brocard inellipse ===
For $\ s=\tfrac{|OB|^2}{|OB|^2+|AB|^2}\; , \quad t=\tfrac{|OA|^2}{|OA|^2+|AB|^2}\;$ one gets the Brocard inellipse. It is uniquely determined by its Brianchon point given in trilinear coordinates $\ K: (|OB|:|OA|:|AB|)\$.

== Derivations of the statements ==
Determination of the inellipse by solving the problem for a hyperbola in an $\xi$-$\eta$-plane and an additional transformation of the solution into the x-y-plane. $M$ is the center of the sought inellipse and $D_1D_2,\; E_1E_2$ two conjugate diameters. In both planes the essential points are assigned by the same symbols. $g_\infty$ is the line at infinity of the x-y-plane.

New coordinates

For the proof of the statements one considers the task projectively and introduces convenient new inhomogene $\xi$-$\eta$-coordinates such that the wanted conic section appears as a hyperbola and the points $U,V$ become the points at infinity of the new coordinate axes. The points $A=(a_1,a_2),\; B=(b_1,b_2)$ will be described in the new coordinate system by $A=[a,0], B=[0,b]$ and the corresponding line has the equation $\frac \xi a + \frac \eta b =1$. (Below it will turn out, that $a,b$ have indeed the same meaning introduced in the statement above.) Now a hyperbola with the coordinate axes as asymptotes is sought, which touches the line $\overline{AB}$. This is an easy task. By a simple calculation one gets the hyperbola with the equation $\eta=\frac{ab}{4\xi}$. It touches the line $\overline{AB}$ at point $W=[\tfrac{a}{2},\tfrac{b}{2}]$.

Coordinate transformation

The transformation of the solution into the x-y-plane will be done using homogeneous coordinates and the matrix

$$\begin{bmatrix}
u_1 & v_1 & 0 \\
u_2 & v_2 & 0 \\
1 & 1  & 1
\end{bmatrix}\quad$$.

A point $[x_1,x_2,x_3]$ is mapped onto

$$\begin{bmatrix}
u_1 & v_1 & 0 \\
u_2 & v_2 & 0 \\
1 & 1  & 1
\end{bmatrix}\begin{bmatrix}x_1\\ x_2\\ x_3 \end{bmatrix}=
\begin{pmatrix}u_1x_1+v_1x_2\\
u_2x_1+v_2x_2\\
x_1+x_2+x_3 \end{pmatrix} \rightarrow \left( \frac{u_1x_1+v_1x_2}{ x_1+x_2+x_3}\; , \; \frac{u_2x_1+v_2x_2}{ x_1+x_2+x_3} \right ), \quad \text{if } x_1+x_2+x_3\ne0.$$

A point $[\xi,\eta]$ of the $\xi$-$\eta$-plane is represented by the column vector $[\xi,\eta,1]^T$ (see homogeneous coordinates). A point at infinity is represented by $[\cdots,\cdots,0]^T$.

Coordinate transformation of essential points

$$U:\ [1,0,0]^T \ \rightarrow \ (u_1,u_2)\ , \quad V:\ [0,1,0]^T \ \rightarrow \ (v_1,v_2)\ ,$$
$$O: \ [0,0] \ \rightarrow \ (0,0) \ ,\quad A: \ [a,0] \rightarrow \ (a_1,a_2)\ , \quad B: \ [0,b] \rightarrow \ (b_1,b_2)\ ,$$
(One should consider: $\ a=\tfrac{1}{s-1}, \ u_i=s a_i,\quad b=\tfrac{1}{t-1}, \ v_i=t b_i \;$; see above.)

$g_\infty: \xi+\eta +1=0 \$ is the equation of the line at infinity of the x-y-plane; its point at infinity is $[1,-1,0]^T$.

$$[1,-1,{\color{red}0}]^T \ \rightarrow \ (u_1-v_1,u_2-v_2,{\color{red}0})^T$$

Hence the point at infinity of $g_\infty$ (in $\xi$-$\eta$-plane) is mapped onto a point at infinity of the x-y-plane. That means: The two tangents of the hyperbola, which are parallel to $g_\infty$, are parallel in the x-y-plane, too. Their points of contact are

$$D_i: \left[\frac{\pm\sqrt{ab}}{2}, \frac{\pm\sqrt{ab}}{2}\right] \ \rightarrow \ \frac{1}{2}\frac{\pm\sqrt{ab}}{1\pm\sqrt{ab}}\;(u_1+v_1,u_2+v_2), \;$$

Because the ellipse tangents at points $D_1,D_2$ are parallel, the chord $D_1D_2$ is a diameter and its midpoint the center $M$ of the ellipse

$$M:\ \frac{1}{2}\frac{ab}{ab-1}\left (u_1+v_1,u_2+v_2\right ) \; .$$

One easily checks, that $M$ has the $\xi$-$\eta$-coordinates

$$\ M: \; \left[\frac{-ab}{2},\frac{-ab}{2}\right]\; .$$

In order to determine the diameter of the ellipse, which is conjugate to $D_1D_2$, in the $\xi$-$\eta$-plane one has to determine the common points $E_1,E_2$ of the hyperbola with the line through $M$ parallel to the tangents (its equation is $\xi+\eta +ab=0$). One gets $E_i: \left[\tfrac{-ab\pm\sqrt{ab(ab-1)}}{2},\tfrac{-ab\mp\sqrt{ab(ab-1)}}{2}\right]$. And in x-y-coordinates:

$$\ E_i=\frac{1}{2}\frac{ab}{ab-1}\left ( u_1+v_1,u_2+v_2\right ) \pm\frac{1}{2}\frac{\sqrt{ab(ab-1)}}{ab-1}\left (u_1-v_1,u_2-v_2\right )\; ,$$

From the two conjugate diameters $D_1D_2,E_1E_2$ there can be retrieved the two vectorial conjugate half diameters

$$\begin{align}
\vec f_1 & =\vec{MD_1}=\frac{1}{2}\frac{\sqrt{ab}}{ab-1}\;(u_1+v_1,u_2+v_2) \\[6pt]
\vec f_2 & =\vec{ME_1}=\frac{1}{2}\sqrt{\frac{ab}{ab-1}}\;(u_1-v_1,u_2-v_2)\;
\end{align}$$

and at least the trigonometric parametric representation of the inellipse:

$$\vec x = \vec{OM}+\vec f_1\cos \varphi + \vec f_2\sin \varphi \; .$$

Analogously to the case of a Steiner ellipse one can determine semiaxes, eccentricity, vertices, an equation in x-y-coordinates and the area of the inellipse.

The third touching point $W$ on $AB$ is:

$$W: \left[\frac{a}{2},\frac{b}{2} \right] \ \rightarrow \ \left( \frac{u_1a+v_1b}{a+b+2}\; ,\; \frac{u_2a+v_2b}{a+b+2}\right) \; .$$

The Brianchon point of the inellipse is the common point $K$ of the three lines $\overline{AV} , \overline{BU}, \overline{OW}$. In the $\xi$-$\eta$-plane these lines have the equations: $\xi=a\; ,\; \eta=b\; , \; a\eta-b\xi=0$. Hence point $K$ has the coordinates:

$$K: \ [a,b] \ \rightarrow \ \left ( \frac{u_1a+v_1b}{a+b+1}\; ,\; \frac{u_2a+v_2b}{a+b+1}\right) \ .$$

Transforming the hyperbola $\ \eta=\frac{ab}{4\xi}$ yields the rational parametric representation of the inellipse:

$$\left[ \xi, \frac{ab}{4\xi} \right] \ \rightarrow \ \left( \frac{4u_1\xi^2+v_1ab}{4\xi^2+4\xi+ab},\frac{4u_2\xi^2+v_2ab}{4\xi^2+4\xi+ab}\right)\ , \ -\infty<\xi<\infty \ .$$

Incircle

Incircle of a triangle

For the incircle there is $|OU|=|OV|$, which is equivalent to

(1)$\; s|OA|=t|OB|\; .\$ Additionally
(2)$\; (1-s)|OA|+(1-t)|OB| = |AB|$. (see diagram)

Solving these two equations for $s,t$ one gets

(3)$\; s=\frac{|OA|+|OB|-|AB|}{2|OA|},\; t=\frac{|OA|+|OB|-|AB|}{2|OB|}\; .$

In order to get the coordinates of the center one firstly calculates using (1) und (3)

$$1 - \frac 1 {ab} = 1-(s-1)(t-1)=-st+s+t=\cdots=\frac{s}{2(|OB|}(|OA|+|OB|+|AB|)\; .$$

Hence

$$\vec{OM}=\frac{|OB|}{s(|OA|+|OB|+|AB|)}\;(s\vec{OA}+t\vec{OB})=\cdots=\frac{|OB|\vec{OA}+|OA|\vec{OB}}{|OA|+|OB|+|AB|}\; .$$

Mandart inellipse

The parameters $s,t$ for the Mandart inellipse can be retrieved from the properties of the points of contact (see de: Ankreis).

Brocard inellipse

The Brocard inellipse of a triangle is uniquely determined by its Brianchon point given in trilinear coordinates $\ K: (|OB|:|OA|:|AB|)\$. Changing the trilinear coordinates into the more convenient representation $\ K: k_1\vec{OA}+k_2\vec{OB}\$ (see trilinear coordinates) yields $\ k_1=\tfrac{|OB|^2}{|OB|^2+|OA|^2+|AB|^2},\; k_2=\tfrac{|OA|^2}{|OB|^2+|OA|^2+|AB|^2}\$. On the other hand, if the parameters $s,t$ of an inellipse are given, one calculates from the formula above for $K$: $\ k_1=\tfrac{s(t-1)}{st-1},\; k_2=\tfrac{t(s-1)}{st-1}\$. Equalizing both expressions for $k_1,k_2$ and solving for $s,t$ yields

$$s=\frac{|OB|^2}{|OB|^2+|AB|^2}\; , \quad t=\frac{|OA|^2}{|OA|^2+|AB|^2}\; .$$

== Inellipse with the greatest area ==
- The Steiner inellipse has the greatest area of all inellipses of a triangle.

Proof

From Apollonios theorem on properties of conjugate semi diameters $\vec f_1,\vec f_2$ of an ellipse one gets:

$F=\pi\left|\det(\vec f_1,\vec f_2)\right|\quad$ (see article on Steiner ellipse).

For the inellipse with parameters $s,t$ one gets

$\det(\vec f_1,\vec f_2) =\frac{1}{4}\frac{ab}{(ab-1)^{3/2}}\det(s\vec a+t \vec b,s\vec a-t \vec b)$

$$=\frac{1}{2}\frac{s\sqrt{s-1}\;t\sqrt{t-1}}{(1-(s-1)(t-1))^{3/2}}\det(\vec b,\vec a)\; ,$$

where $\vec a=(a_1,a_2), \; \vec b=(b_1,b_2),\;\vec u=(u_1,u_2), \vec v=(v_1,v_2),\; \vec u=s\vec a,\; \vec v=t\vec b$.
In order to omit the roots, it is enough to investigate the extrema of function $G(s,t)=\tfrac{s^2(s-1)\;t^2(t-1)}{(1-(s-1)(t-1))^3}$:

$$G_s=0 \ \rightarrow \ 3s-2+2(s-1)(t-1)=0\; .$$

Because $G(s,t)=G(t,s)$ one gets from the exchange of s and t:

$$G_t=0\ \rightarrow \ 3t-2+2(s-1)(t-1)=0\; .$$

Solving both equations for s and t yields

$s=t=\frac{1}{2}\; ,\quad$ which are the parameters of the Steiner inellipse.

Three mutually touching inellipses of a triangle

== See also ==
- Circumconic and inconic
