= Ellipse =

Plane curve

An ellipse (red) obtained as the intersection of a cone with an inclined plane.

Ellipses: examples with increasing eccentricity

In mathematics, an ellipse is a plane curve surrounding two focal points, such that for all points on the curve, the sum of both distances to the two focal points is a constant. It generalizes a circle, which is the special type of ellipse in which the two focal points are the same. The elongation of an ellipse is measured by its eccentricity $e$, a number ranging from $e = 0$ (the limiting case of a circle) to $e = 1$ (the limiting case of infinite elongation, no longer an ellipse but a parabola).

An ellipse has a simple algebraic formula for its area, but for its perimeter (also known as circumference), integration is required to obtain the exact solution.

The largest and smallest diameters of an ellipse, also known as its width and height, are typically denoted 2a and 2b. An ellipse has four extreme points: two vertices at the endpoints of the major axis and two co-vertices at the endpoints of the minor axis.

Notable points and line segments in an ellipse.

Analytically, the equation of a standard ellipse centered at the origin is:
$$\frac{x^2}{a^2}+\frac{y^2}{b^2} = 1 .$$
Assuming $a \ge b$, the foci are $(\pm c, 0)$, where $c = \sqrt{a^2-b^2}$ (the linear eccentricity) is the distance from the center to a focus. The standard parametrization is:
$$(x,y) = (a\cos(t),b\sin(t)) \quad \text{for} \quad 0\leq t\leq 2\pi.$$

Ellipses are the closed type of conic section: a plane curve tracing the intersection of a cone with a plane (see figure). Ellipses have many similarities with the other two forms of conic sections, parabolas and hyperbolas, both of which are open and unbounded. An angled cross section of a right circular cylinder is also an ellipse.

An ellipse may also be defined in terms of one focal point and a line outside the ellipse called the directrix: for all points on the ellipse, the ratio between the distance to the focus and the distance to the directrix is a constant, called the eccentricity:
$$e = \frac{c}{a} = \sqrt{1 - \frac{b^2}{a^2}}.$$

Ellipses are common in physics, astronomy and engineering. For example, the orbit of each planet in the Solar System is approximately an ellipse with the Sun at one focus point (more precisely, the focus is the barycenter of the Sun–planet pair). The same is true for moons orbiting planets and all other systems of two astronomical bodies. The shapes of planets and stars are often well described by ellipsoids. A circle viewed from a side angle looks like an ellipse: that is, the ellipse is the image of a circle under parallel or perspective projection. The ellipse is also the simplest Lissajous figure formed when the horizontal and vertical motions are sinusoids with the same frequency: a similar effect leads to elliptical polarization of light in optics.

The name, ἔλλειψις (élleipsis, "omission"), was given by Apollonius of Perga in his Conics.

== Definition as locus of points ==
Ellipse: definition by sum of distances to foci

Ellipse: definition by focus and circular directrix

An ellipse can be defined geometrically as a set or locus of points in the Euclidean plane:

Given two fixed points $F_1, F_2$ called the foci and a distance $2a$ which is greater than the distance between the foci, the ellipse is the set of points $P$ such that the sum of the distances $|PF_1|,\ |PF_2|$ is equal to $2a$:
$$E = \left\{P\in \R^2 \,\mid\, \left|PF_2\right| + \left|PF_1\right| = 2a \right\} .$$

The midpoint $C$ of the line segment joining the foci is called the center of the ellipse. The line through the foci is called the major axis, and the line perpendicular to it through the center is the minor axis. The major axis intersects the ellipse at two vertices $V_1,V_2$, which have distance $a$ to the center. The distance $c$ of the foci to the center is called the focal distance or linear eccentricity. The quotient $e = \tfrac{c}{a}$ is defined as the eccentricity.

The case $F_1 = F_2$ yields a circle and is included as a special type of ellipse.

The equation $\left|PF_2\right| + \left|PF_1\right| = 2a$ can be viewed in a different way (see figure):

If $c_2$ is the circle with center $F_2$ and radius $2a$, then the distance of a point $P$ to the circle $c_2$ equals the distance to the focus $F_1$:
$$\left|PF_1\right| = \left|Pc_2\right|.$$

$c_2$ is called the circular directrix (related to focus $F_2$) of the ellipse. This property should not be confused with the definition of an ellipse using a directrix line below.

Using Dandelin spheres, one can prove that the section of a cone with a plane is an ellipse when the plane has slope less than that of the lines on the cone and the plane does not contain the apex.

== In Cartesian coordinates ==
Shape parameters: a: semi-major axis, b: semi-minor axis, c: linear eccentricity, p: semi-latus rectum (usually $\ell$).

=== Standard equation ===
The standard form of an ellipse in Cartesian coordinates assumes that the origin is the center of the ellipse, the x-axis is the major axis, and:

- the foci are the points $F_1 = (c,\, 0),\ F_2=(-c,\, 0)$,
- the vertices are $V_1 = (a,\, 0),\ V_2 = (-a,\, 0)$.

For an arbitrary point $(x,y)$ the distance to the focus $(c,0)$ is $\sqrt{(x - c)^2 + y^2 }$ and to the other focus $\sqrt{(x + c)^2 + y^2}$. Hence the point $(x,\, y)$ is on the ellipse whenever:
$$\sqrt{(x - c)^2 + y^2} + \sqrt{(x + c)^2 + y^2} = 2a\ .$$

Removing the radicals by suitable squarings and using $b^2 = a^2-c^2$ (see diagram) produces the standard equation of the ellipse:
$$\frac{x^2}{a^2} + \frac{y^2}{b^2} = 1,$$
or, solved for y:
$$y = \pm\frac{b}{a}\sqrt{\vphantom{\left(a^2 - x^2\right)} a^2 - x^2} = \pm \sqrt{\left(a^2 - x^2\right)\left(1 - e^2\right)}.$$

The width and height parameters $a,\; b$ are called the semi-major and semi-minor axes. The top and bottom points $V_3 = (0,\, b),\; V_4 = (0,\, -b)$ are the co-vertices. The distances from a point $(x,\, y)$ on the ellipse to the left and right foci are $a + ex$ and $a - ex$.

It follows from the equation that the ellipse is symmetric with respect to the coordinate axes and hence with respect to the origin.

=== Parameters ===
==== Principal axes ====
Throughout this article, the semi-major and semi-minor axes are denoted $a$ and $b$, respectively, i.e. $a \ge b > 0 \ .$

In principle, the canonical ellipse equation $\tfrac{x^2}{a^2} + \tfrac{y^2}{b^2} = 1$ may have $a < b$ (and hence the ellipse would be taller than it is wide). This form can be converted to the standard form by transposing the variable names $x$ and $y$ and the parameter names $a$ and $b.$

==== Linear eccentricity ====
This is the distance from the center to a focus: $c = \sqrt{a^2 - b^2}$.

==== Eccentricity ====
Eccentricity e in terms of semi-major a and semi-minor b axes: e² + (b/a)² = 1

The eccentricity can be expressed as:
$$e = \frac{c}{a} = \sqrt{1 - \left(\frac{b}{a}\right)^2},$$

assuming $a > b.$ An ellipse with equal axes ($a = b$) has zero eccentricity, and is a circle.

==== Semi-latus rectum ====
The length of the chord through one focus, perpendicular to the major axis, is called the latus rectum. One half of it is the semi-latus rectum $\ell$. A calculation shows:
$$\ell = \frac{b^2}a = a \left(1 - e^2\right).$$

The semi-latus rectum $\ell$ is equal to the radius of curvature at the vertices (see section curvature).

=== Tangent ===
An arbitrary line $g$ intersects an ellipse at 0, 1, or 2 points, respectively called an exterior line, tangent and secant. Through any point of an ellipse there is a unique tangent. The tangent at a point $(x_1,\, y_1)$ of the ellipse $\tfrac{x^2}{a^2} + \tfrac{y^2}{b^2} = 1$ has the coordinate equation:
$$\frac{x_1}{a^2}x + \frac{y_1}{b^2}y = 1.$$

A vector parametric equation of the tangent is:
$$\vec x = \begin{pmatrix} x_1 \\ y_1 \end{pmatrix} + s \left(\begin{array}{r}
-y_1 a^2 \\
x_1 b^2
\end{array}\right) , \quad s \in \R.$$

Proof: Let $(x_1,\, y_1)$ be a point on an ellipse and
$$\vec{x} = \begin{pmatrix} x_1 \\ y_1 \end{pmatrix} + s \begin{pmatrix} u \\ v \end{pmatrix}$$
be the equation of any line $g$ containing $(x_1,\, y_1)$. Inserting the line's equation into the ellipse equation and respecting $\frac{x_1^2}{a^2} + \frac{y_1^2}{b^2} = 1$ yields:
$$\frac{\left(x_1 + su\right)^2}{a^2} + \frac{\left(y_1 + sv\right)^2}{b^2} = 1\ \quad\Longrightarrow\quad
2s\left(\frac{x_1u}{a^2} + \frac{y_1v}{b^2}\right) + s^2\left(\frac{u^2}{a^2} + \frac{v^2}{b^2}\right) = 0\ .$$
There are then cases:

1. $\frac{x_1}{a^2}u + \frac{y_1}{b^2}v = 0.$ Then line $g$ and the ellipse have only point $(x_1,\, y_1)$ in common, and $g$ is a tangent. The tangent direction has perpendicular vector
  $$\begin{pmatrix} \frac{x_1}{a^2} & \frac{y_1}{b^2} \end{pmatrix}$$
  , so the tangent line has equation $\frac{x_1}{a^2}x + \tfrac{y_1}{b^2}y = k$ for some $k$. Because $(x_1,\, y_1)$ is on the tangent and the ellipse, one obtains $k = 1$.
2. $\frac{x_ 1}{a^2}u + \frac{y_1}{b^2}v \ne 0.$ Then line $g$ has a second point in common with the ellipse, and is a secant.

Using (1) one finds that
$$\begin{pmatrix} -y_1 a^2 & x_1 b^2 \end{pmatrix}$$
is a tangent vector at point $(x_1,\, y_1)$, which proves the vector equation.

If $(x_1, y_1)$ and $(u, v)$ are two points of the ellipse such that $\frac{x_1u}{a^2} + \tfrac{y_1v}{b^2} = 0$, then the points lie on two conjugate diameters (see below). (If $a = b$, the ellipse is a circle and "conjugate" means "orthogonal".)

=== Shifted ellipse ===
If the standard ellipse is shifted to have center $\left(x_\circ,\, y_\circ\right)$, its equation is
$$\frac{\left(x - x_\circ\right)^2}{a^2} + \frac{\left(y - y_\circ\right)^2}{b^2} = 1 \ .$$

The axes are still parallel to the x- and y-axes.

=== General ellipse ===
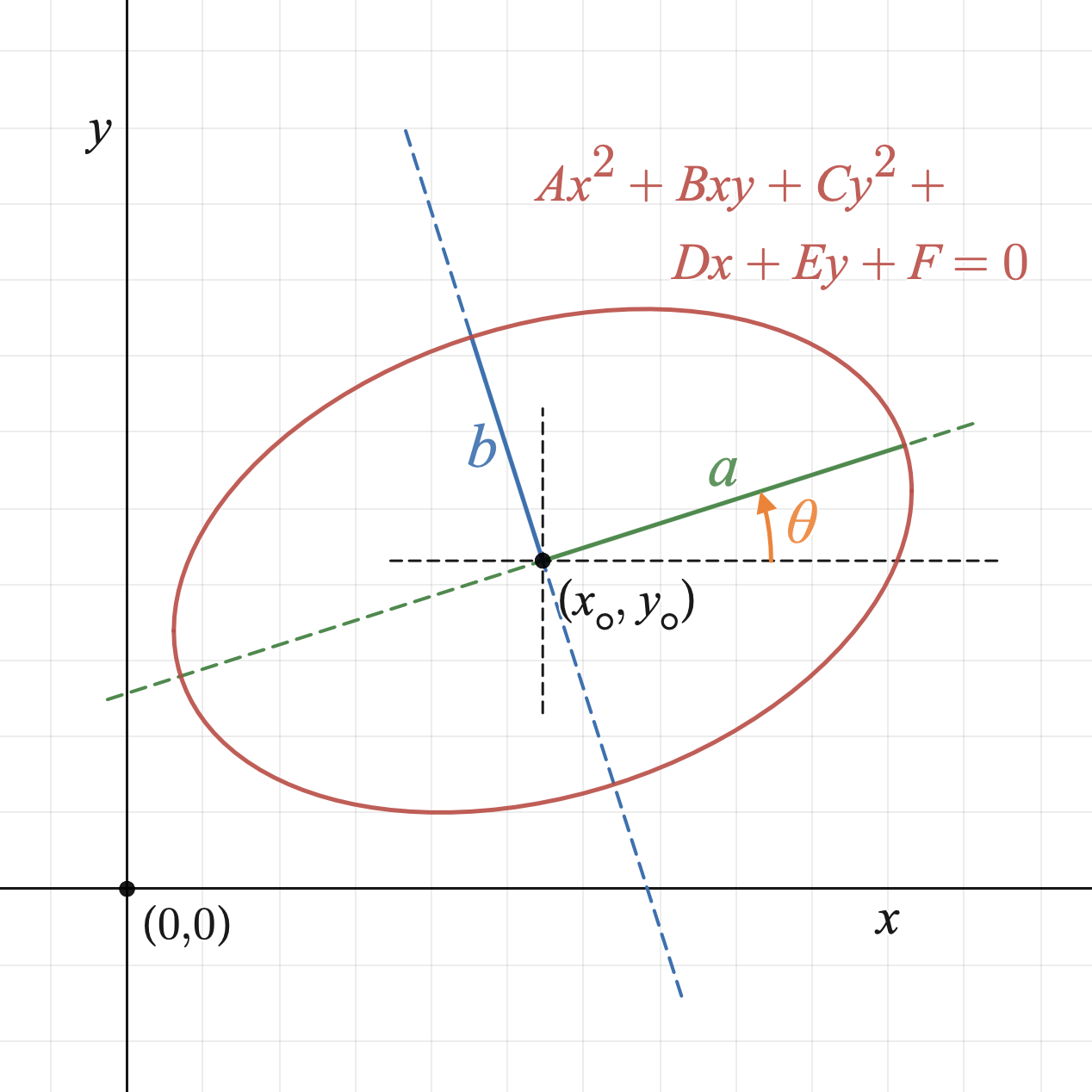
A general ellipse in the plane can be uniquely described as a bivariate quadratic equation of Cartesian coordinates, or using center, semi-major and semi-minor axes, and angle

In analytic geometry, the ellipse is defined as a quadric: the set of points $(x,\, y)$ of the Cartesian plane that, in non-degenerate cases, satisfy the implicit equation
$$Ax^2 + Bxy + Cy^2 + Dx + Ey + F = 0$$
provided $B^2 - 4AC < 0.$

To distinguish the degenerate cases from the non-degenerate case, let ∆ be the determinant
$$\Delta = \begin{vmatrix}
A & \frac{1}{2}B & \frac{1}{2}D \\
\frac{1}{2}B &            C & \frac{1}{2}E \\
\frac{1}{2}D & \frac{1}{2}E &            F
\end{vmatrix} = ACF + \tfrac14 BDE - \tfrac14(AE^2 + CD^2 + FB^2).$$

Then the ellipse is a non-degenerate real ellipse if and only if C∆ < 0. If C∆ > 0, we have an imaginary ellipse, and if ∆ = 0, we have a point ellipse.

The general equation's coefficients can be obtained from known semi-major axis $a$, semi-minor axis $b$, center coordinates $\left(x_\circ,\, y_\circ\right)$, and rotation angle $\theta$ (the angle from the positive horizontal axis to the ellipse's major axis) using the formulae:
$$\begin{align}
A &=   a^2 \sin^2\theta + b^2 \cos^2\theta &
B &=  2\left(b^2 - a^2\right) \sin\theta \cos\theta \\[1ex]
C &=   a^2 \cos^2\theta + b^2 \sin^2\theta &
D &= -2A x_\circ   -  B y_\circ \\[1ex]
E &= - B x_\circ   - 2C y_\circ &
F &=   A x_\circ^2 +  B x_\circ y_\circ + C y_\circ^2 - a^2 b^2.
\end{align}$$

These expressions can be derived from the canonical equation
$$\frac{X^2}{a^2} + \frac{Y^2}{b^2} = 1$$
by a Euclidean transformation of the coordinates $(X,\, Y)$:
$$\begin{align}
X &=  \left(x - x_\circ\right) \cos\theta + \left(y - y_\circ\right) \sin\theta, \\
Y &= -\left(x - x_\circ\right) \sin\theta + \left(y - y_\circ\right) \cos\theta.
\end{align}$$

Conversely, the canonical form parameters can be obtained from the general-form coefficients by the equations:

$$\begin{align}
a, b    &= \frac{-\sqrt{2 \big(A E^2 + C D^2 - B D E + (B^2 - 4 A C) F\big)\big((A + C) \pm \sqrt{(A - C)^2 + B^2}\big)}}{B^2 - 4 A C}, \\
x_\circ  &= \frac{2CD - BE}{B^2 - 4AC}, \\[5mu]
y_\circ  &= \frac{2AE - BD}{B^2 - 4AC}, \\[5mu]
\theta &= \tfrac12 \operatorname{atan2}(-B,\, C-A),
\end{align}$$

where atan2 is the 2-argument arctangent function.

== Parametric representation ==
The construction of points based on the parametric equation and the interpretation of parameter t, which is due to de la Hire

Ellipse points calculated by the rational representation with equally spaced parameters ($\Delta u = 0.2$).

=== Standard parametric representation ===
Using trigonometric functions, a parametric representation of the standard ellipse $\tfrac{x^2}{a^2}+\tfrac{y^2}{b^2} = 1$ is:
$$(x,\, y) = (a \cos t,\, b \sin t),\ 0 \le t < 2\pi\, .$$

The parameter t (called the eccentric anomaly in astronomy) is not the angle of $(x(t),y(t))$ with the x-axis, but has a geometric meaning due to Philippe de La Hire (see § Drawing ellipses below).

=== Rational representation ===
With the substitution $u = \tan\left(\frac{t}{2}\right)$ and trigonometric formulae one obtains
$$\cos t = \frac{1 - u^2}{1 + u^2}\ ,\quad \sin t = \frac{2u}{1 + u^2}$$

and the rational parametric equation of an ellipse
$$\begin{cases}
x(u) = a \, \dfrac{1 - u^2}{1 + u^2} \\[10mu]
y(u) = b \, \dfrac{2u}{1 + u^2} \\[10mu]
-\infty < u < \infty
\end{cases}$$

which covers any point of the ellipse $\tfrac{x^2}{a^2} + \tfrac{y^2}{b^2} = 1$ except the left vertex $(-a,\, 0)$.

For $u \in [0,\, 1],$ this formula represents the right upper quarter of the ellipse moving counter-clockwise with increasing $u.$ The left vertex is the limit $\lim_{u \to \pm \infty} (x(u),\, y(u)) = (-a,\, 0)\;.$

Alternately, if the parameter $[u:v]$ is considered to be a point on the real projective line $\mathbf{P}(\mathbf{R})$, then the corresponding rational parametrization is
$$[u:v] \mapsto \left(a\frac{v^2 - u^2}{v^2 + u^2}, b\frac{2uv}{v^2 + u^2} \right).$$

Then $[1:0] \mapsto (-a,\, 0).$

Rational representations of conic sections are commonly used in computer-aided design (see Bézier curve).

=== Tangent slope as parameter ===
A parametric representation, which uses the slope $m$ of the tangent at a point of the ellipse can be obtained from the derivative of the standard representation $\vec x(t) = (a \cos t,\, b \sin t)$:
$$\vec x'(t) = (-a\sin t,\, b\cos t) \quad \rightarrow \quad m = -\frac{b}{a}\cot t\quad \rightarrow \quad \cot t = -\frac{ma}{b}.$$

With help of trigonometric formulae one obtains:
$$\cos t = \frac{\cot t}{\pm\sqrt{1 + \cot^2t}} = \frac{-ma}{\pm\sqrt{m^2 a^2 + b^2}}\ ,\quad\quad
\sin t = \frac{1}{\pm\sqrt{1 + \cot^2t}} = \frac{b}{\pm\sqrt{m^2 a^2 + b^2}}.$$

Replacing $\cos t$ and $\sin t$ of the standard representation yields:
$$\vec c_\pm(m) = \left(-\frac{ma^2}{\pm\sqrt{m^2 a^2 + b^2}},\;\frac{b^2}{\pm\sqrt{m^2a^2 + b^2}}\right),\, m \in \R.$$

Here $m$ is the slope of the tangent at the corresponding ellipse point, $\vec c_+$ is the upper and $\vec c_-$ the lower half of the ellipse. The vertices$(\pm a,\, 0)$, having vertical tangents, are not covered by the representation.

The equation of the tangent at point $\vec c_\pm(m)$ has the form $y = mx + n$. The still unknown $n$ can be determined by inserting the coordinates of the corresponding ellipse point $\vec c_\pm(m)$:
$$y = mx \pm \sqrt{m^2 a^2 + b^2}\, .$$

This description of the tangents of an ellipse is an essential tool for the determination of the orthoptic of an ellipse. The orthoptic article contains another proof, without differential calculus and trigonometric formulae.

=== General ellipse ===
Ellipse as an affine image of the unit circle

Another definition of an ellipse uses affine transformations:

Any ellipse is an affine image of the unit circle with equation $x^2 + y^2 = 1$.

Parametric representation

An affine transformation of the Euclidean plane has the form $\vec x \mapsto \vec f\!_0 + A\vec x$, where $A$ is a regular matrix (with non-zero determinant) and $\vec f\!_0$ is an arbitrary vector. If $\vec f\!_1, \vec f\!_2$ are the column vectors of the matrix $A$, the unit circle $(\cos(t), \sin(t))$, $0 \leq t \leq 2\pi$, is mapped onto the ellipse:
$$\vec x = \vec p(t) = \vec f\!_0 + \vec f\!_1 \cos t + \vec f\!_2 \sin t \, .$$

Here $\vec f\!_0$ is the center and $\vec f\!_1,\; \vec f\!_2$ are the directions of two conjugate diameters, in general not perpendicular.

Vertices

The four vertices of the ellipse are $\vec p(t_0),\;\vec p\left(t_0 \pm \tfrac{\pi}{2}\right),\; \vec p\left(t_0 + \pi\right)$, for a parameter $t = t_0$ defined by:
$$\cot (2t_0) = \frac{\vec f\!_1^{\,2} - \vec f\!_2^{\,2}}{2\vec f\!_1 \cdot \vec f\!_2}.$$

(If $\vec f\!_1 \cdot \vec f\!_2 = 0$, then $t_0 = 0$.) This is derived as follows. The tangent vector at point $\vec p(t)$ is:
$$\vec p\,'(t) = -\vec f\!_1\sin t + \vec f\!_2\cos t \ .$$

At a vertex parameter $t = t_0$, the tangent is perpendicular to the major/minor axes, so:
$$0 = \vec p'(t) \cdot \left(\vec p(t) -\vec f\!_0\right) = \left(-\vec f\!_1\sin t + \vec f\!_2\cos t\right) \cdot \left(\vec f\!_1 \cos t + \vec f\!_2 \sin t\right).$$

Expanding and applying the identities $\; \cos^2 t -\sin^2 t=\cos 2t,\ \ 2\sin t \cos t = \sin 2t\;$ gives the equation for $t = t_0\; .$

Area

From Apollonios theorem (see below) one obtains:
The area of an ellipse $\;\vec x = \vec f_0 +\vec f_1 \cos t +\vec f_2 \sin t\;$ is
$$A=\pi \left|\det(\vec f_1, \vec f_2)\right| .$$

Semiaxes

With the abbreviations $\; M=\vec f_1^2+\vec f_2^2, \ N = \left|\det(\vec f_1,\vec f_2)\right|$ the statements of Apollonios's theorem can be written as:
$$a^2+b^2=M, \quad ab=N \ .$$
Solving this nonlinear system for $a,b$ yields the semiaxes:
$$\begin{align}
a &= \frac{1}{2}(\sqrt{M+2N}+\sqrt{M-2N}) \\[1ex]
b &= \frac{1}{2}(\sqrt{M+2N}-\sqrt{M-2N})\, .
\end{align}$$

Implicit representation

Solving the parametric representation for $\; \cos t,\sin t\;$ by Cramer's rule and using $\;\cos^2t+\sin^2t -1=0\;$, one obtains the implicit representation
$$\det{\left(\vec x\!-\!\vec f\!_0,\vec f\!_2\right)^2} + \det{\left(\vec f\!_1,\vec x\!-\!\vec f\!_0\right)^2} - \det{\left(\vec f\!_1,\vec f\!_2\right)^2} = 0.$$

Conversely: If the equation

$x^2+2cxy+d^2y^2-e^2=0\ ,$ with $\; d^2-c^2 >0 \; ,$

of an ellipse centered at the origin is given, then the two vectors
$$\vec f_1={e \choose 0},\quad \vec f_2=\frac{e}{\sqrt{d^2-c^2}}{-c\choose 1}$$
point to two conjugate points and the tools developed above are applicable.

Example: For the ellipse with equation $\;x^2+2xy+3y^2-1=0\;$ the vectors are
$$\vec f_1={1 \choose 0},\quad \vec f_2=\frac{1}{\sqrt{2}}{-1\choose 1} .$$

Whirls: nested, scaled and rotated ellipses. The spiral is not drawn: we see it as the locus of points where the ellipses are especially close to each other.

Rotated standard ellipse

For $\vec f_0= {0\choose 0},\;\vec f_1= a {\cos \theta\choose \sin \theta},\;\vec f_2= b{-\sin \theta\choose \;\cos \theta}$ one obtains a parametric representation of the standard ellipse rotated by angle $\theta$:
$$\begin{align}
x &= x_\theta(t) = a\cos\theta\cos t - b\sin\theta\sin t \, , \\
y &= y_\theta(t) = a\sin\theta\cos t + b\cos\theta\sin t \, .
\end{align}$$

Ellipse in space

The definition of an ellipse in this section gives a parametric representation of an arbitrary ellipse, even in space, if one allows $\vec f\!_0, \vec f\!_1, \vec f\!_2$ to be vectors in space.

== Polar forms ==
=== Polar form relative to center ===
Polar coordinates centered at the center.

In polar coordinates, with the origin at the center of the ellipse and with the angular coordinate $\theta$ measured from the major axis, the ellipse's equation is
$$r(\theta) = \frac{ab}{\sqrt{(b \cos \theta)^2 + (a\sin \theta)^2}}=\frac{b}{\sqrt{1 - (e\cos\theta)^2}}$$
where $e$ is the eccentricity (not Euler's number).

=== Polar form relative to focus ===
Polar coordinates centered at focus.

If instead we use polar coordinates with the origin at one focus, with the angular coordinate $\theta = 0$ still measured from the major axis, the ellipse's equation is
$$r(\theta)=\frac{a (1-e^2)}{1\pm e\cos\theta }$$

where the sign in the denominator is negative if the reference direction $\theta = 0$ points towards the center (as illustrated on the right), and positive if that direction points away from the center.

The angle $\theta$ is called the true anomaly of the point. The numerator $\ell=a (1-e^2)$ is the semi-latus rectum.

== Eccentricity and the directrix property ==
Ellipse: directrix property

Each of the two lines parallel to the minor axis, and at a distance of $d = \frac{a^2}{c} = \frac{a}{e}$ from it, is called a directrix of the ellipse (see diagram).

For an arbitrary point $P$ of the ellipse, the quotient of the distance to one focus and to the corresponding directrix (see diagram) is equal to the eccentricity:
$$\frac{\left|PF_1\right|}{\left|Pl_1\right|} = \frac{\left|PF_2\right|}{\left|Pl_2\right|} = e = \frac{c}{a}\ .$$

The proof for the pair $F_1, l_1$ follows from the fact that $\left|PF_1\right|^2 = (x - c)^2 + y^2,\ \left|Pl_1\right|^2 = \left(x - \tfrac{a^2}{c}\right)^2$ and $y^2 = b^2 - \tfrac{b^2}{a^2}x^2$ satisfy the equation
$$\left|PF_1\right|^2 - \frac{c^2}{a^2}\left|Pl_1\right|^2 = 0\, .$$

The second case is proven analogously.

The converse is also true and can be used to define an ellipse (in a manner similar to the definition of a parabola):

For any point $F$ (focus), any line $l$ (directrix) not through $F$, and any real number $e$ with $0 < e < 1,$ the ellipse is the locus of points for which the quotient of the distances to the point and to the line is $e,$ that is:
$$E = \left\{P\ \left|\ \frac{|PF|}{|Pl|} = e\right.\right\}.$$

The extension to $e = 0$, which is the eccentricity of a circle, is not allowed in this context in the Euclidean plane. However, one may consider the directrix of a circle to be the line at infinity in the projective plane.

(The choice $e = 1$ yields a parabola, and if $e > 1$, a hyperbola.)

Pencil of conics with a common vertex and common semi-latus rectum

Proof

Let $F = (f,\, 0),\ e > 0$, and assume $(0,\, 0)$ is a point on the curve. The directrix $l$ has equation $x = -\tfrac{f}{e}$. With $P = (x,\, y)$, the relation $|PF|^2 = e^2|Pl|^2$ produces the equations

$(x - f)^2 + y^2 = e^2\left(x + \frac{f}{e}\right)^2 = (ex + f)^2$ and $x^2\left(e^2 - 1\right) + 2xf(1 + e) - y^2 = 0.$

The substitution $p = f(1 + e)$ yields
$$x^2\left(e^2 - 1\right) + 2px - y^2 = 0.$$

This is the equation of an ellipse ($e < 1$), or a parabola ($e = 1$), or a hyperbola ($e > 1$). All of these non-degenerate conics have, in common, the origin as a vertex (see diagram).

If $e < 1$, introduce new parameters $a,\, b$ so that $1 - e^2 = \tfrac{b^2}{a^2}, \text{ and }\ p = \tfrac{b^2}{a}$, and then the equation above becomes
$$\frac{(x - a)^2}{a^2} + \frac{y^2}{b^2} = 1\, ,$$

which is the equation of an ellipse with center $(a,\, 0)$, the x-axis as major axis, and the major/minor semi axis $a,\, b$.

Construction of a directrix

Construction of a directrix

Because of $c\cdot\tfrac{a^2}{c}=a^2$ point $L_1$ of directrix $l_1$ (see diagram) and focus $F_1$ are inverse with respect to the circle inversion at circle $x^2+y^2=a^2$ (in diagram green). Hence $L_1$ can be constructed as shown in the diagram. Directrix $l_1$ is the perpendicular to the main axis at point $L_1$.

General ellipse

If the focus is $F = \left(f_1,\, f_2\right)$ and the directrix $ux + vy + w = 0$, one obtains the equation
$$\left(x - f_1\right)^2 + \left(y - f_2\right)^2 = e^2 \frac{\left(ux + vy + w\right)^2}{u^2 + v^2}\ .$$

(The right side of the equation uses the Hesse normal form of a line to calculate the distance $|Pl|$.)

== Focus-to-focus reflection property ==
Ellipse: the tangent line w bisects the supplementary angle L-P-F1 of the angle F1-P-F2 between the lines from point P to the foci.

Rays from one focus reflect off the ellipse to pass through the other focus.

An ellipse possesses the following property:

The normal at a point $P$ bisects the angle between the lines $\overline{PF_1},\, \overline{PF_2}$.

Proof

Because the tangent line is perpendicular to the normal, an equivalent statement is that the tangent is the external angle bisector of the lines to the foci (see diagram). Let $L$ be the point on the line $\overline{PF_2}$ with distance $2a$ to the focus $F_2$, where $a$ is the semi-major axis of the ellipse. Let line $w$ be the external angle bisector of the lines $\overline{PF_1}$ and $\overline{PF_2}.$ Take any other point $Q$ on $w.$ By the triangle inequality and the angle bisector theorem, $2a = \left|LF_2\right| < {}$$\left|QF_2\right| + \left|QL\right| = {}$$\left|QF_2\right| + \left|QF_1\right|,$ so $Q$ must be outside the ellipse. As this is true for every choice of $Q,$ $w$ only intersects the ellipse at the single point $P$ so must be the tangent line.

Application

The rays from one focus are reflected by the ellipse to the second focus. This property has optical and acoustic applications similar to the reflective property of a parabola (see whispering gallery). It also serves to formulate Alhazen's problem of reflection on a circle tangent to the ellipse.

Additionally, because of the focus-to-focus reflection property of ellipses, if the rays are allowed to continue propagating, reflected rays will eventually align closely with the major axis.

== Conjugate diameters ==
=== Definition of conjugate diameters ===
Orthogonal diameters of a circle with a square of tangents, midpoints of parallel chords and an affine image, which is an ellipse with conjugate diameters, a parallelogram of tangents and midpoints of chords.

A circle has the following property:

The midpoints of parallel chords lie on a diameter.

An affine transformation preserves parallelism and midpoints of line segments, so this property is true for any ellipse. (Note that the parallel chords and the diameter are no longer orthogonal.)

Definition

Two diameters $d_1,\, d_2$ of an ellipse are conjugate if the midpoints of chords parallel to $d_1$ lie on $d_2\ .$

From the diagram one finds:

Two diameters $\overline{P_1 Q_1},\, \overline{P_2 Q_2}$ of an ellipse are conjugate whenever the tangents at $P_1$ and $Q_1$ are parallel to $\overline{P_2 Q_2}$.

Conjugate diameters in an ellipse generalize orthogonal diameters in a circle.

In the parametric equation for a general ellipse given above,
$$\vec x = \vec p(t) = \vec f\!_0 +\vec f\!_1 \cos t + \vec f\!_2 \sin t,$$

any pair of points $\vec p(t),\ \vec p(t + \pi)$ belong to a diameter, and the pair $\vec p\left(t + \tfrac{\pi}{2}\right),\ \vec p\left(t - \tfrac{\pi}{2}\right)$ belong to its conjugate diameter.

For the common parametric representation $(a\cos t,b\sin t)$ of the ellipse with equation $\tfrac{x^2}{a^2}+\tfrac{y^2}{b^2}=1$ one gets: The points

$(x_1,y_1)=(\pm a\cos t,\pm b\sin t)\quad$ (signs: (+,+) or (−,−) )
$(x_2,y_2)=({\color{red}{\mp}} a\sin t,\pm b\cos t)\quad$ (signs: (−,+) or (+,−) )
are conjugate and
$$\frac{x_1x_2}{a^2}+\frac{y_1y_2}{b^2}=0\ .$$

In case of a circle the last equation collapses to $x_1x_2+y_1y_2=0\ .$

=== Theorem of Apollonios on conjugate diameters ===
Theorem of Apollonios

For the alternative area formula

For an ellipse with semi-axes $a,\, b$ the following is true:

Let $c_1$ and $c_2$ be halves of two conjugate diameters (see diagram) then
1. $c_1^2 + c_2^2 = a^2 + b^2$.
2. The triangle $O,P_1,P_2$ with sides $c_1,\, c_2$ (see diagram) has the constant area $A_\Delta = \frac{1}{2}ab$, which can be expressed by $A_\Delta=\tfrac 1 2 c_2d_1=\tfrac 1 2 c_1c_2\sin\alpha$, too. $d_1$ is the altitude of point $P_1$ and $\alpha$ the angle between the half diameters. Hence the area of the ellipse (see section metric properties) can be written as $A_{el}=\pi ab=\pi c_2d_1=\pi c_1c_2\sin\alpha$.
3. The parallelogram of tangents adjacent to the given conjugate diameters has the $\text{Area}_{12} = 4ab\ .$

Proof

Let the ellipse be in the canonical form with parametric equation
$$\vec p(t) = (a\cos t,\, b\sin t).$$

The two points $\vec c_1 = \vec p(t),\ \vec c_2 = \vec p\left(t + \frac{\pi}{2}\right)$ are on conjugate diameters (see previous section). From trigonometric formulae one obtains $\vec c_2 = (-a\sin t,\, b\cos t)^\mathsf{T}$ and
$$\left|\vec c_1\right|^2 + \left|\vec c_2\right|^2 = \cdots = a^2 + b^2\, .$$

The area of the triangle generated by $\vec c_1,\, \vec c_2$ is
$$A_\Delta = \tfrac{1}{2} \det\left(\vec c_1,\, \vec c_2\right) = \cdots = \tfrac{1}{2}ab$$

and from the diagram it can be seen that the area of the parallelogram is 8 times that of $A_\Delta$. Hence
$$\text{Area}_{12} = 4ab\, .$$

== Orthogonal tangents ==
Ellipse with its orthoptic

For the ellipse $\tfrac{x^2}{a^2} + \tfrac{y^2}{b^2} = 1$ the intersection points of orthogonal tangents lie on the circle $x^2 + y^2 = a^2 + b^2$.

This circle is called orthoptic or director circle of the ellipse (not to be confused with the circular directrix defined above).

== Drawing ellipses ==
Central projection of circles (gate)

Ellipses appear in descriptive geometry as images (parallel or central projection) of circles. There exist various tools to draw an ellipse. Computers provide the fastest and most accurate method for drawing an ellipse. However, technical tools (ellipsographs) to draw an ellipse without a computer exist. The principle was known to the 5th century mathematician Proclus, and the tool now known as an elliptical trammel was invented by Leonardo da Vinci.

If there is no ellipsograph available, one can draw an ellipse using an approximation by the four osculating circles at the vertices.

For any method described below, knowledge of the axes and the semi-axes is necessary (or equivalently: the foci and the semi-major axis). If this presumption is not fulfilled one has to know at least two conjugate diameters. With help of Rytz's construction the axes and semi-axes can be retrieved.

=== de La Hire's point construction ===
The following construction of single points of an ellipse is due to de La Hire. It is based on the standard parametric representation $(a\cos t,\, b\sin t)$ of an ellipse:

1. Draw the two circles centered at the center of the ellipse with radii $a,b$ and the axes of the ellipse.
2. Draw a line through the center, which intersects the two circles at point $A$ and $B$, respectively.
3. Draw a line through $A$ that is parallel to the minor axis and a line through $B$ that is parallel to the major axis. These lines meet at an ellipse point $P$ (see diagram).
4. Repeat steps (2) and (3) with different lines through the center.
de La Hire's method

Animation of the method

Ellipse: gardener's method

=== Pins-and-string method ===
The characterization of an ellipse as the locus of points so that sum of the distances to the foci is constant leads to a method of drawing one using two drawing pins, a length of string, and a pencil. In this method, pins are pushed into the paper at two points, which become the ellipse's foci. A string is tied at each end to the two pins; its length after tying is $2a$. The tip of the pencil then traces an ellipse if it is moved while keeping the string taut. Using two pegs and a rope, gardeners use this procedure to outline an elliptical flower bed—thus it is called the gardener's ellipse. The Byzantine architect Anthemius of Tralles (c. 600) described how this method could be used to construct an elliptical reflector, and it was elaborated in a now-lost 9th-century treatise by Al-Ḥasan ibn Mūsā.

A similar method for drawing confocal ellipses with a closed string is due to the Irish bishop Charles Graves.

=== Paper strip methods ===
The two following methods rely on the parametric representation (see § Standard parametric representation, above):
$$(a\cos t,\, b\sin t)$$

This representation can be modeled technically by two simple methods. In both cases center, the axes and semi axes $a,\, b$ have to be known.

Method 1

The first method starts with

a strip of paper of length $a + b$.

The point, where the semi axes meet is marked by $P$. If the strip slides with both ends on the axes of the desired ellipse, then point $P$ traces the ellipse. For the proof one shows that point $P$ has the parametric representation $(a\cos t,\, b\sin t)$, where parameter $t$ is the angle of the slope of the paper strip.

A technical realization of the motion of the paper strip can be achieved by a Tusi couple (see animation). The device is able to draw any ellipse with a fixed sum $a + b$, which is the radius of the large circle. This restriction may be a disadvantage in real life. More flexible is the second paper strip method.

Ellipse construction: paper strip method 1

Ellipses with Tusi couple. Two examples: red and cyan.

A variation of the paper strip method 1 uses the observation that the midpoint $N$ of the paper strip is moving on the circle with center $M$ (of the ellipse) and radius $\tfrac{a + b}{2}$. Hence, the paperstrip can be cut at point $N$ into halves, connected again by a joint at $N$ and the sliding end $K$ fixed at the center $M$ (see diagram). After this operation the movement of the unchanged half of the paperstrip is unchanged. This variation requires only one sliding shoe.

Variation of the paper strip method 1

Animation of the variation of the paper strip method 1

Ellipse construction: paper strip method 2

Method 2

The second method starts with

a strip of paper of length $a$.

One marks the point, which divides the strip into two substrips of length $b$ and $a - b$. The strip is positioned onto the axes as described in the diagram. Then the free end of the strip traces an ellipse, while the strip is moved. For the proof, one recognizes that the tracing point can be described parametrically by $(a\cos t,\, b\sin t)$, where parameter $t$ is the angle of slope of the paper strip.

This method is the base for several ellipsographs (see section below).

Similar to the variation of the paper strip method 1 a variation of the paper strip method 2 can be established (see diagram) by cutting the part between the axes into halves.

Elliptical trammel (principle)

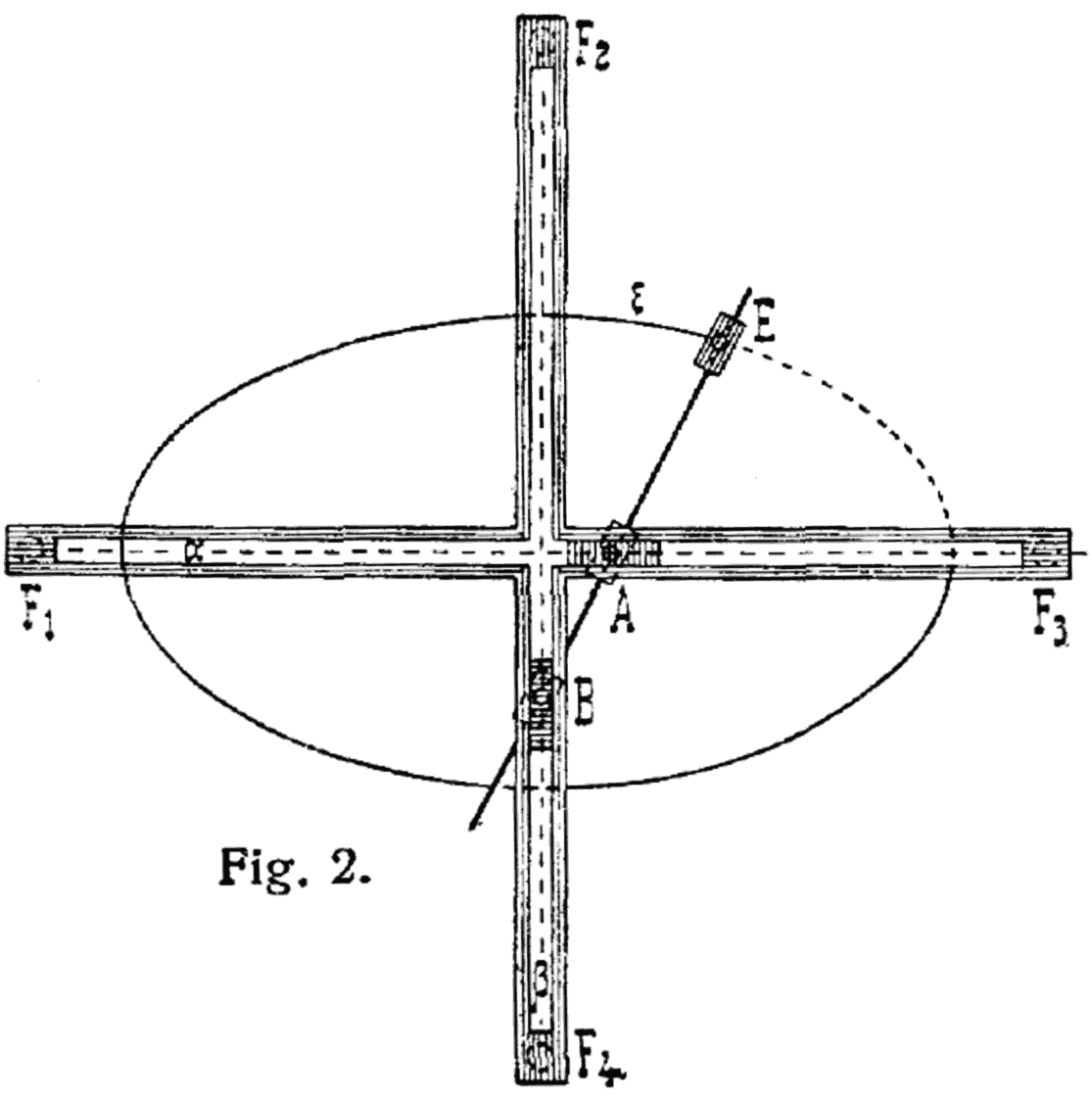
Ellipsograph due to Benjamin Bramer

Variation of the paper strip method 2

Most ellipsograph drafting instruments are based on the second paperstrip method.

Approximation of an ellipse with osculating circles

=== Approximation by osculating circles ===
From Metric properties below, one obtains:

- The radius of curvature at the vertices $V_1,\, V_2$ is: $\tfrac{b^2}{a}$
- The radius of curvature at the co-vertices $V_3,\, V_4$ is: $\tfrac{a^2}{b}\ .$

The diagram shows an easy way to find the centers of curvature $C_1 = \left(a - \tfrac{b^2}{a}, 0\right),\, C_3 = \left(0, b - \tfrac{a^2}{b}\right)$ at vertex $V_1$ and co-vertex $V_3$, respectively:

1. mark the auxiliary point $H = (a,\, b)$ and draw the line segment $V_1 V_3\ ,$
2. draw the line through $H$, which is perpendicular to the line $V_1 V_3\ ,$
3. the intersection points of this line with the axes are the centers of the osculating circles.

(proof: simple calculation.)

The centers for the remaining vertices are found by symmetry.

With help of a French curve one draws a curve, which has smooth contact to the osculating circles.

=== Steiner generation ===
Ellipse: Steiner generation

Ellipse: Steiner generation

The following method to construct single points of an ellipse relies on the Steiner generation of a conic section:

Given two pencils $B(U),\, B(V)$ of lines at two points $U,\, V$ (all lines containing $U$ and $V$, respectively) and a projective but not perspective mapping $\pi$ of $B(U)$ onto $B(V)$, then the intersection points of corresponding lines form a non-degenerate projective conic section.

For the generation of points of the ellipse $\tfrac{\vphantom{y^2} x^2}{a^2} + \tfrac{y^2}{b^2} = 1$ one uses the pencils at the vertices $V_1,\, V_2$. Let $P = (0,\, b)$ be an upper co-vertex of the ellipse and $A = (-a,\, 2b),\, B = (a,\,2b)$.

$P$ is the center of the rectangle $V_1,\, V_2,\, B,\, A$. The side $\overline{AB}$ of the rectangle is divided into n equal spaced line segments and this division is projected parallel with the diagonal $AV_2$ as direction onto the line segment $\overline{V_1B}$ and assign the division as shown in the diagram. The parallel projection together with the reverse of the orientation is part of the projective mapping between the pencils at $V_1$ and $V_2$ needed. The intersection points of any two related lines $V_1 B_i$ and $V_2 A_i$ are points of the uniquely defined ellipse. With help of the points $C_1,\, \dotsc$ the points of the second quarter of the ellipse can be determined. Analogously one obtains the points of the lower half of the ellipse.

Steiner generation can also be defined for hyperbolas and parabolas. It is sometimes called a parallelogram method because one can use other points rather than the vertices, which starts with a parallelogram instead of a rectangle.

=== As hypotrochoid ===
An ellipse (in red) as a special case of the hypotrochoid with R = 2r

The ellipse is a special case of the hypotrochoid when $R = 2r$, as shown in the adjacent image. The special case of a moving circle with radius $r$ inside a circle with radius $R = 2r$ is called a Tusi couple.

== Inscribed angles and three-point form ==
=== Circles ===
Circle: inscribed angle theorem

A circle with equation $\left(x - x_\circ\right)^2 + \left(y - y_\circ\right)^2 = r^2$ is uniquely determined by three points $\left(x_1, y_1\right),\; \left(x_2,\,y_2\right),\; \left(x_3,\, y_3\right)$ not on a line. A simple way to determine the parameters $x_\circ,y_\circ,r$ uses the inscribed angle theorem for circles:

For four points $P_i = \left(x_i,\, y_i\right),\ i = 1,\, 2,\, 3,\, 4,\,$ (see diagram) the following statement is true:
The four points are on a circle if and only if the angles at $P_3$ and $P_4$ are equal.

Usually one measures inscribed angles by a degree or radian θ, but here the following measurement is more convenient:

In order to measure the angle between two lines with equations $y = m_1x + d_1,\ y = m_2x + d_2,\ m_1 \ne m_2,$ one uses the quotient:
$$\frac{1 + m_1 m_2}{m_2 - m_1} = \cot\theta\ .$$

==== Inscribed angle theorem for circles ====
For four points $P_i = \left(x_i,\, y_i\right),\ i = 1,\, 2,\, 3,\, 4,\,$ no three of them on a line, we have the following (see diagram):

The four points are on a circle, if and only if the angles at $P_3$ and $P_4$ are equal. In terms of the angle measurement above, this means:
$$\frac{(x_4 - x_1)(x_4 - x_2) + (y_4 - y_1)(y_4 - y_2)}
{(y_4 - y_1)(x_4 - x_2) - (y_4 - y_2)(x_4 - x_1)} =
\frac{(x_3 - x_1)(x_3 - x_2) + (y_3 - y_1)(y_3 - y_2)}
{(y_3 - y_1)(x_3 - x_2) - (y_3 - y_2)(x_3 - x_1)}.$$

At first the measure is available only for chords not parallel to the y-axis, but the final formula works for any chord.

==== Three-point form of circle equation ====
As a consequence, one obtains an equation for the circle determined by three non-collinear points $P_i = \left(x_i,\, y_i\right)$:
$$\frac{({\color{red}x} - x_1)({\color{red}x} - x_2) + ({\color{red}y} - y_1)({\color{red}y} - y_2)}
{({\color{red}y} - y_1)({\color{red}x} - x_2) - ({\color{red}y} - y_2)({\color{red}x} - x_1)} =
\frac{(x_3 - x_1)(x_3 - x_2) + (y_3 - y_1)(y_3 - y_2)}
{(y_3 - y_1)(x_3 - x_2) - (y_3 - y_2)(x_3 - x_1)}.$$

For example, for $P_1 = (2,\, 0),\; P_2 = (0,\, 1),\; P_3 = (0,\,0)$ the three-point equation is:

$\frac{(x - 2)x + y(y - 1)}{yx - (y - 1)(x - 2)} = 0$, which can be rearranged to $(x - 1)^2 + \left(y - \tfrac{1}{2}\right)^2 = \tfrac{5}{4}\ .$

Using vectors, dot products and determinants this formula can be arranged more clearly, letting $\vec x = (x,\, y)$:
$$\frac{\left({\color{red}\vec x} - \vec x_1\right) \cdot \left({\color{red}\vec x} - \vec x_2\right)}
{\det\left({\color{red}\vec x} - \vec x_1,{\color{red}\vec x} - \vec x_2\right)} =
\frac{\left(\vec x_3 - \vec x_1\right) \cdot \left(\vec x_3 - \vec x_2\right)}
{\det\left(\vec x_3 - \vec x_1, \vec x_3 - \vec x_2\right)}.$$

The center of the circle $\left(x_\circ,\, y_\circ\right)$ satisfies:
$$\begin{bmatrix}
1 & \dfrac{y_1 - y_2}{x_1 - x_2} \\[2ex]
\dfrac{x_1 - x_3}{y_1 - y_3} & 1
\end{bmatrix}
\begin{bmatrix} x_\circ \\[1ex] y_\circ \end{bmatrix}
=
\begin{bmatrix}
\dfrac{x_1^2 - x_2^2 + y_1^2 - y_2^2}{2(x_1 - x_2)} \\[2ex]
\dfrac{y_1^2 - y_3^2 + x_1^2 - x_3^2}{2(y_1 - y_3)}
\end{bmatrix}.$$

The radius is the distance between any of the three points and the center.
$$r = \sqrt{\left(x_1 - x_\circ\right)^2 + \left(y_1 - y_\circ\right)^2}
= \sqrt{\left(x_2 - x_\circ\right)^2 + \left(y_2 - y_\circ\right)^2}
= \sqrt{\left(x_3 - x_\circ\right)^2 + \left(y_3 - y_\circ\right)^2}.$$

=== Ellipses ===
This section considers the family of ellipses defined by equations $\tfrac{\left(x - x_\circ\right)^2}{a^2} + \tfrac{\left(y - y_\circ\right)^2}{b^2} = 1$ with a fixed eccentricity $e$. It is convenient to use the parameter:
$${\color{blue}q} = \frac{a^2}{b^2} = \frac{1}{1 - e^2},$$

and to write the ellipse equation as:
$$\left(x - x_\circ\right)^2 + {\color{blue}q}\, \left(y - y_\circ\right)^2 = a^2,$$

where q is fixed and $x_\circ,\, y_\circ,\, a$ vary over the real numbers. (Such ellipses have their axes parallel to the coordinate axes: if $q < 1$, the major axis is parallel to the x-axis; if $q > 1$, it is parallel to the y-axis.)

Inscribed angle theorem for an ellipse

Like a circle, such an ellipse is determined by three points not on a line.

For this family of ellipses, one introduces the following q-analog angle measure, which is not a function of the usual angle measure θ:

In order to measure an angle between two lines with equations $y = m_1x + d_1,\ y = m_2x + d_2,\ m_1 \ne m_2$ one uses the quotient:
$$\frac{1 + {\color{blue}q}\; m_1 m_2}{m_2 - m_1}\ .$$

==== Inscribed angle theorem for ellipses ====
Given four points $P_i = \left(x_i,\, y_i\right),\ i = 1,\, 2,\, 3,\, 4$, no three of them on a line (see diagram).
The four points are on an ellipse with equation $(x - x_\circ)^2 + {\color{blue}q}\, (y - y_\circ)^2 = a^2$ if and only if the angles at $P_3$ and $P_4$ are equal in the sense of the measurement above—that is, if
$$\frac{(x_4 - x_1)(x_4 - x_2) + {\color{blue}q}\;(y_4 - y_1)(y_4 - y_2)}
{(y_4 - y_1)(x_4 - x_2) - (y_4 - y_2)(x_4 - x_1)} =
\frac{(x_3 - x_1)(x_3 - x_2) + {\color{blue}q}\;(y_3 - y_1)(y_3 - y_2)}
{(y_3 - y_1)(x_3 - x_2) - (y_3 - y_2)(x_3 - x_1)}\ .$$

At first the measure is available only for chords which are not parallel to the y-axis. But the final formula works for any chord. The proof follows from a straightforward calculation. For the direction of proof given that the points are on an ellipse, one can assume that the center of the ellipse is the origin.

==== Three-point form of ellipse equation ====
A consequence, one obtains an equation for the ellipse determined by three non-collinear points $P_i = \left(x_i,\, y_i\right)$:
$$\frac{({\color{red}x} - x_1)({\color{red}x} - x_2) + {\color{blue}q}\;({\color{red}y} - y_1)({\color{red}y} - y_2)}
{({\color{red}y} - y_1)({\color{red}x} - x_2) - ({\color{red}y} - y_2)({\color{red}x} - x_1)} =
\frac{(x_3 - x_1)(x_3 - x_2) + {\color{blue}q}\;(y_3 - y_1)(y_3 - y_2)}
{(y_3 - y_1)(x_3 - x_2) - (y_3 - y_2)(x_3 - x_1)}\ .$$

For example, for $P_1 = (2,\, 0),\; P_2 = (0,\,1),\; P_3 = (0,\, 0)$ and $q = 4$ one obtains the three-point form

$\frac{(x - 2)x + 4y(y - 1)}{yx - (y - 1)(x - 2)} = 0$ and after conversion $\frac{(x - 1)^2}{2} + \frac{\left(y - \frac{1}{2}\right)^2}{\frac{1}{2}} = 1.$

Analogously to the circle case, the equation can be written more clearly using vectors:
$$\frac{\left({\color{red}\vec x} - \vec x_1\right)*\left({\color{red}\vec x} - \vec x_2\right)}
{\det\left({\color{red}\vec x} - \vec x_1,{\color{red}\vec x} - \vec x_2\right)}
= \frac{\left(\vec x_3 - \vec x_1\right)*\left(\vec x_3 - \vec x_2\right)}
{\det\left(\vec x_3 - \vec x_1, \vec x_3 - \vec x_2\right)},$$

where $*$ is the modified dot product $\vec u*\vec v = u_x v_x + {\color{blue}q}\,u_y v_y.$

== Pole-polar relation ==
Ellipse: pole-polar relation

Any ellipse can be described in a suitable coordinate system by an equation $\tfrac{x^2}{a^2} + \tfrac{y^2}{b^2} = 1$. The equation of the tangent at a point $P_1 = \left(x_1,\, y_1\right)$ of the ellipse is $\tfrac{x_1x}{a^2} + \tfrac{y_1y}{b^2} = 1.$ If one allows point $P_1 = \left(x_1,\, y_1\right)$ to be an arbitrary point different from the origin, then

point $P_1 = \left(x_1,\, y_1\right) \neq (0,\, 0)$ is mapped onto the line $\tfrac{x_1 x}{a^2} + \tfrac{y_1 y}{b^2} = 1$, not through the center of the ellipse.

This relation between points and lines is a bijection.

The inverse function maps

- line $y = mx + d,\ d \ne 0$ onto the point $\left(-\tfrac{ma^2}{d},\, \tfrac{b^2}{d}\right)$ and
- line $x = c,\ c \ne 0$ onto the point $\left(\tfrac{a^2}{c},\, 0\right).$

Such a relation between points and lines generated by a conic is called pole-polar relation or polarity. The pole is the point; the polar the line.

By calculation one can confirm the following properties of the pole-polar relation of the ellipse:

- For a point (pole) on the ellipse, the polar is the tangent at this point (see diagram: $P_1,\, p_1$).
- For a pole $P$ outside the ellipse, the intersection points of its polar with the ellipse are the tangency points of the two tangents passing $P$ (see diagram: $P_2,\, p_2$).
- For a point within the ellipse, the polar has no point with the ellipse in common (see diagram: $F_1,\, l_1$).
1. The intersection point of two polars is the pole of the line through their poles.
2. The foci $(c,\, 0)$ and $(-c,\, 0)$, respectively, and the directrices $x = \tfrac{a^2}{c}$ and $x = -\tfrac{a^2}{c}$, respectively, belong to pairs of pole and polar. Because they are even polar pairs with respect to the circle $x^2+y^2=a^2$, the directrices can be constructed by compass and straightedge (see Inversive geometry).

Pole-polar relations exist for hyperbolas and parabolas as well.

== Metric properties ==
All metric properties given below refer to an ellipse with equation

$$\frac{x^2}{a^2}+\frac{y^2}{b^2}= 1$$	1

except for the section on the area enclosed by a tilted ellipse, where the generalized form of Eq.(1) will be given.

=== Area ===
The area $A_\text{ellipse}$ enclosed by an ellipse is:

$$A_\text{ellipse} = \pi ab$$	2

where $a$ and $b$ are the lengths of the semi-major and semi-minor axes, respectively. The area formula $\pi a b$ is intuitive: start with a circle of radius $b$ (so its area is $\pi b^2$) and stretch it by a factor $a/b$ to make an ellipse. This scales the area by the same factor: $\pi b^2(a/b) = \pi a b.$ However, using the same approach for the circumference would be fallacious – compare the integrals $\int f(x)\, dx$ and $\int \sqrt{1+f'^2(x)}\, dx$. It is also easy to rigorously prove the area formula using integration as follows. Equation (1) can be rewritten as $y(x) = b \sqrt{1 - x^2 / a^2}.$ For $x\in[-a,a],$ this curve is the top half of the ellipse. So twice the integral of $y(x)$ over the interval $[-a,a]$ will be the area of the ellipse:
$$\begin{align}
A_\text{ellipse} &= \int_{-a}^a 2b\sqrt{1 - \frac{x^2}{a^2}}\,dx\\
&= \frac ba \int_{-a}^a 2\sqrt{a^2 - x^2}\,dx.
\end{align}$$

The second integral is the area of a circle of radius $a,$ that is, $\pi a^2.$ So
$$A_\text{ellipse} = \frac{b}{a}\pi a^2 = \pi ab.$$

An ellipse defined implicitly by $Ax^2+ Bxy + Cy^2 = 1$ has area $2\pi / \sqrt{4AC - B^2}.$

The area can also be expressed in terms of eccentricity and the length of the semi-major axis as $a^2\pi\sqrt{1-e^2}$ (obtained by solving for flattening, then computing the semi-minor axis).

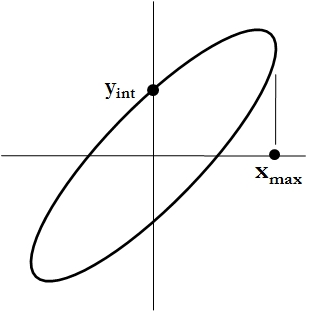
The area enclosed by a tilted ellipse is $\pi\; y_\text{int}\, x_\text{max}$.

So far we have dealt with erect ellipses, whose major and minor axes are parallel to the $x$ and $y$ axes. However, some applications require tilted ellipses. In charged-particle beam optics, for instance, the enclosed area of an erect or tilted ellipse is an important property of the beam, its emittance. In this case a simple formula still applies, namely

$$A_\text{ellipse} = \pi\; y_\text{int}\, x_\text{max} = \pi\; x_\text{int}\, y_\text{max}$$	3

where $y_{\text{int}}$, $x_{\text{int}}$ are intercepts and $x_{\text{max}}$, $y_{\text{max}}$ are maximum values. It follows directly from Apollonios's theorem.

=== Circumference ===
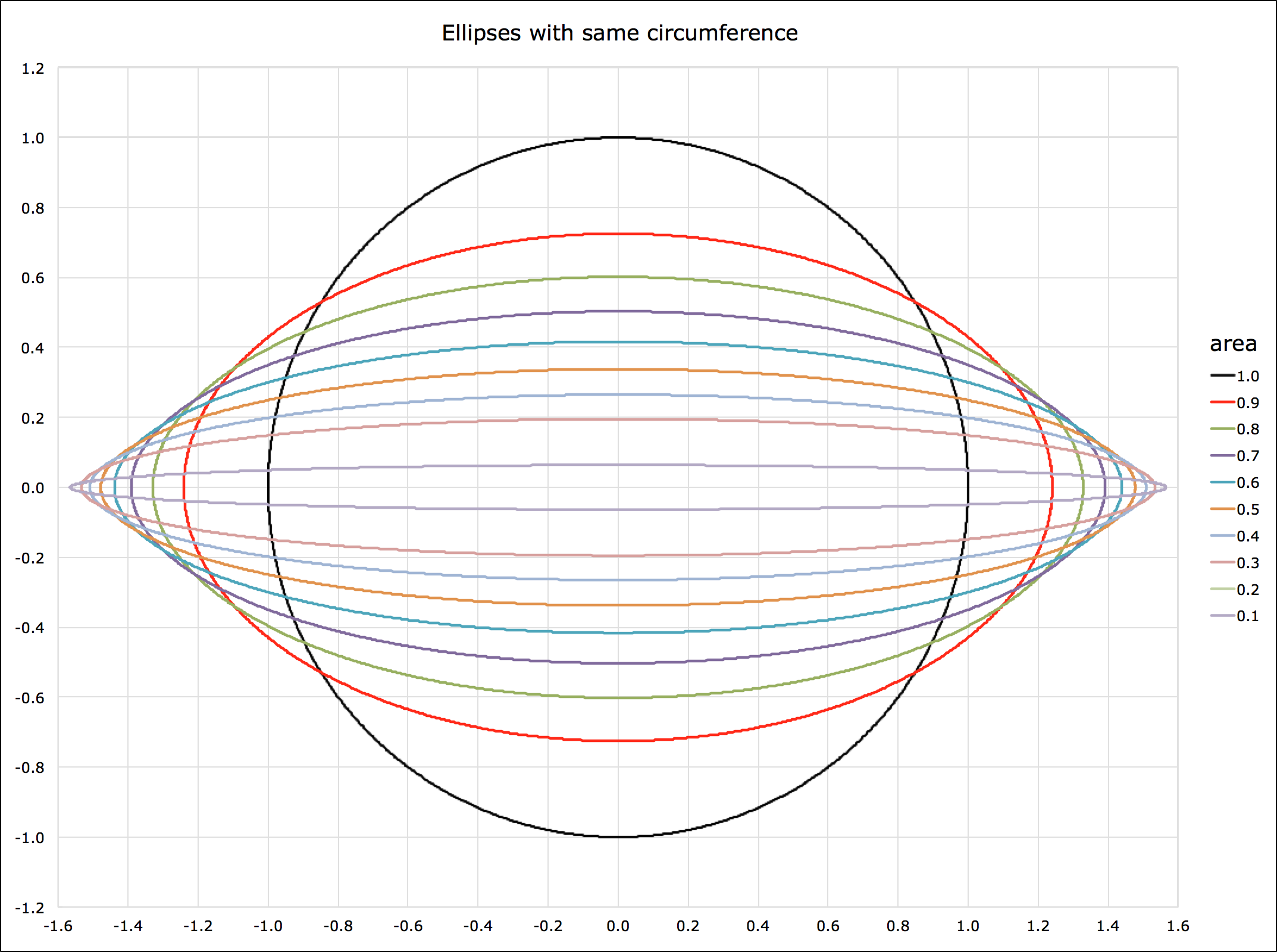
Ellipses with same circumference

The circumference $C$ of an ellipse is:
$$C \,=\, 4a\int_0^{\pi/2}\sqrt {1 - e^2 \sin^2\theta}\ d\theta \,=\, 4 a \,E(e)$$

where again $a$ is the length of the semi-major axis, $e=\sqrt{1 - b^2/a^2}$ is the eccentricity, and the function $E$ is the complete elliptic integral of the second kind,
$$E(e) \,=\, \int_0^{\pi/2}\sqrt {1 - e^2 \sin^2\theta}\ d\theta$$
which is in general not an elementary function.

The circumference of the ellipse may be evaluated in terms of $E(e)$ using Gauss's arithmetic-geometric mean; this is a quadratically converging iterative method (see here for details).

The exact infinite series is:
$$\begin{align}
\frac C{2\pi a} &= 1 - \left(\frac{1}{2}\right)^2e^2 - \left(\frac{1\cdot 3}{2\cdot 4}\right)^2\frac{e^4}{3} - \left(\frac{1\cdot 3\cdot 5}{2\cdot 4\cdot 6}\right)^2\frac{e^6}{5} - \cdots \\
&= 1 - \sum_{n=1}^\infty \left(\frac{(2n-1)!!}{(2n)!!}\right)^2 \frac{e^{2n}}{2n-1} \\
&= -\sum_{n=0}^\infty \left(\frac{(2n-1)!!}{(2n)!!}\right)^2 \frac{e^{2n}}{2n-1},
\end{align}$$
where $n!!$ is the double factorial (extended to negative odd integers in the usual way, giving $(-1)!! = 1$ and $(-3)!! = -1$).

This series converges, but by expanding in terms of $h = (a-b)^2 / (a+b)^2,$ James Ivory, Bessel and Kummer derived a series that converges much more rapidly. It is most concisely written in terms of the binomial coefficient with $n = 1/2$:
$$\begin{align}
\frac{C}{\pi(a+b)}
&= \sum_{n=0}^\infty {\frac 12 \choose n}^2 h^n \\
&= \sum_{n=0}^\infty \left(\frac{(2n-3)!!}{(2n)!!}\right)^2 h^n \\
&= \sum_{n=0}^\infty \left(\frac{(2n-3)!!}{2^n n!}\right)^2 h^n \\
&= \sum_{n=0}^\infty \left(\frac{1}{(2n-1)4^n}\binom{2n}{n}\right)^2 h^n \\
&= 1 + \frac{h}{4} + \frac{h^2}{64} + \frac{h^3}{256} + \frac{25\,h^4}{16384} + \frac{49\,h^5}{65536} + \frac{441\,h^6}{2^{20}} + \frac{1089\,h^7}{2^{22}} + \cdots.
\end{align}$$
The coefficients are slightly smaller (by a factor of $2n-1$), but also $e^4/16 \le h \le e^4$ is numerically much smaller than $e$ except at $h = e = 0$ and $h = e = 1$. For eccentricities less than 0.5 ($h < 0.005$), the error is at the limits of double-precision floating-point after the $h^4$ term.

Srinivasa Ramanujan gave two close approximations for the circumference in §16 of "Modular Equations and Approximations to $\pi$"; they are
$$\frac C\pi \approx 3(a + b) - \sqrt{(3a + b)(a + 3b)}  = 3(a + b) - \sqrt{3(a+b)^2 + 10ab}$$
and
$$\frac C{\pi(a+b)} \approx 1+\frac{3h}{10+\sqrt{4-3h}},$$
where $h$ takes on the same meaning as above. The errors in these approximations, which were obtained empirically, are of order $h^3$ and $h^5,$ respectively. This is because the second formula's infinite series expansion matches Ivory's formula up to the $h^4$ term.

=== Arc length ===
More generally, the arc length of a portion of the circumference, as a function of the angle subtended (or x coordinates of any two points on the upper half of the ellipse), is given by an incomplete elliptic integral. The upper half of an ellipse is parameterized by
$$y = b\ \sqrt{ 1-\frac{x^{2}}{a^{2}}\ } ~.$$

Then the arc length $s$ from $\ x_{1}\$ to $\ x_{2}\$ is:
$$s = -b\int_{\arccos \frac{x_1}{a}}^{\arccos \frac{x_2}{a}} \sqrt{\ 1 + \left( \tfrac{a^2}{b^2} - 1 \right)\ \sin^2 z ~} \; dz ~.$$

This is equivalent to
$$s = b\ \left[ \; E\left(z \;\Biggl|\; 1 - \frac{a^2}{b^2} \right) \; \right]^{\arccos \frac{x_1}{a}}_{z\ =\ \arccos \frac{x_2}{a}}$$

where $E(z \mid m)$ is the incomplete elliptic integral of the second kind with parameter $m=k^{2}.$

Some lower and upper bounds on the circumference of the canonical ellipse $\ x^2/a^2 + y^2/b^2 = 1\$ with $\ a \geq b\$ are
$$\begin{align}
2\pi b &\le C \le 2\pi a\ , \\
\pi (a+b) &\le C \le 4(a+b)\ , \\
4\sqrt{a^2+b^2\ } &\le C \le \sqrt{2\ } \pi \sqrt{a^2 + b^2\ } ~.
\end{align}$$

Here the upper bound $\ 2\pi a\$ is the circumference of a circumscribed concentric circle passing through the endpoints of the ellipse's major axis, and the lower bound $4\sqrt{a^2+b^2}$ is the perimeter of an inscribed rhombus with vertices at the endpoints of the major and the minor axes.

Given an ellipse whose axes are drawn, we can construct the endpoints of a particular elliptic arc whose length is one eighth of the ellipse's circumference using only straightedge and compass in a finite number of steps; for some specific shapes of ellipses, such as when the axes have a length ratio of $\sqrt2 : 1$, it is additionally possible to construct the endpoints of a particular arc whose length is one twelfth of the circumference. (The vertices and co-vertices are already endpoints of arcs whose length is one half or one quarter of the ellipse's circumference.) However, the general theory of straightedge-and-compass elliptic division appears to be unknown, unlike in the case of the circle and the lemniscate. The division in special cases has been investigated by Legendre in his classical treatise.

=== Curvature ===
The curvature is given by:

$$\kappa = \frac{1}{a^2 b^2}\left(\frac{x^2}{a^4}+\frac{y^2}{b^4}\right)^{-\frac{3}{2}}\ ,$$

and the radius of curvature, ρ = 1/κ, at point $(x,y)$:
$$\rho = a^2 b^2 \left(\frac{x^{2}}{a^4} + \frac{y^{2}}{b^4}\right)^\frac{3}{2} = \frac{1}{a^4 b^4} \sqrt{\left(a^4 y^{2} + b^4 x^{2}\right)^3} \ .$$
The radius of curvature of an ellipse, as a function of angle θ from the center, is:
$$R(\theta)=\frac{a^2}{b}\biggl(\frac{1-e^2(2-e^2)(\cos\theta)^2}{1-e^2(\cos\theta)^2}\biggr)^{3/2}\,,$$
where e is the eccentricity.

Radius of curvature at the two vertices $(\pm a,0)$ and the centers of curvature:
$$\rho_0 = \frac{b^2}{a}=p\ , \qquad \left(\pm\frac{c^2}{a}\,\bigg|\,0\right)\ .$$

Radius of curvature at the two co-vertices $(0,\pm b)$ and the centers of curvature:
$$\rho_1 = \frac{a^2}{b}\ , \qquad \left(0\,\bigg|\,\pm\frac{c^2}{b}\right)\ .$$
The locus of all the centers of curvature is called an evolute. In the case of an ellipse, the evolute is an astroid.

== In triangle geometry ==
Ellipses appear in triangle geometry as

1. Steiner ellipse: ellipse through the vertices of the triangle with center at the centroid,
2. inellipses: ellipses which touch the sides of a triangle. Special cases are the Steiner inellipse and the Mandart inellipse.

== As plane sections of quadrics ==
Ellipses appear as plane sections of the following quadrics:

- Ellipsoid
- Elliptic cone
- Elliptic cylinder
- Hyperboloid of one sheet
- Hyperboloid of two sheets
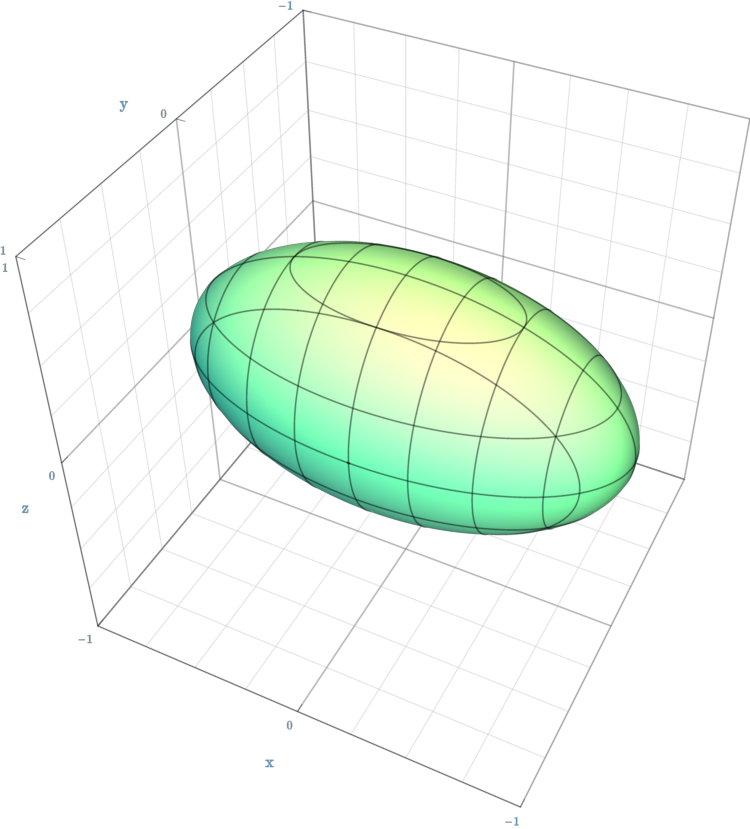
Ellipsoid

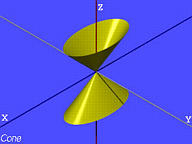
Elliptic cone

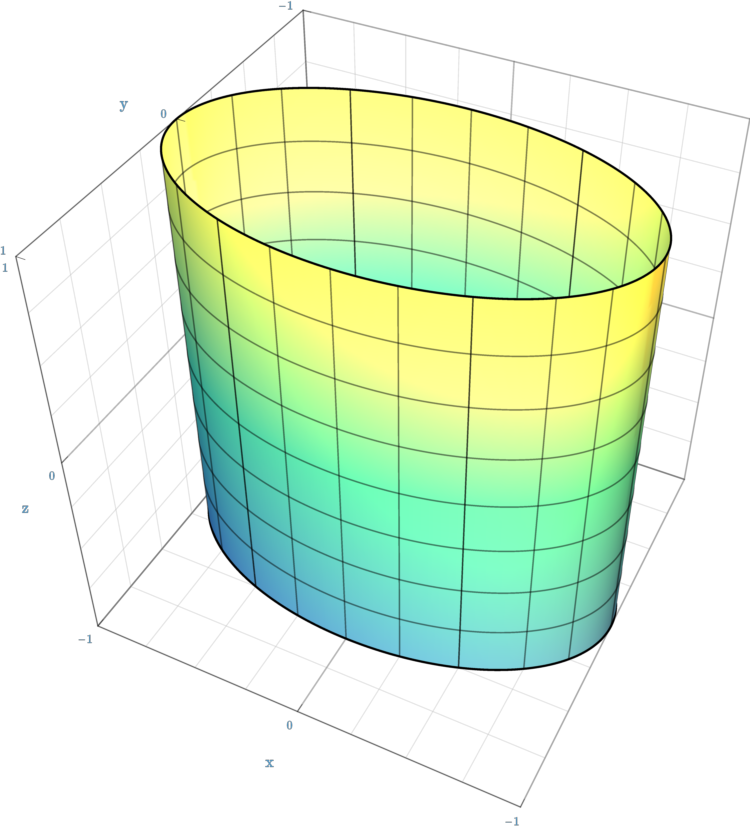
Elliptic cylinder

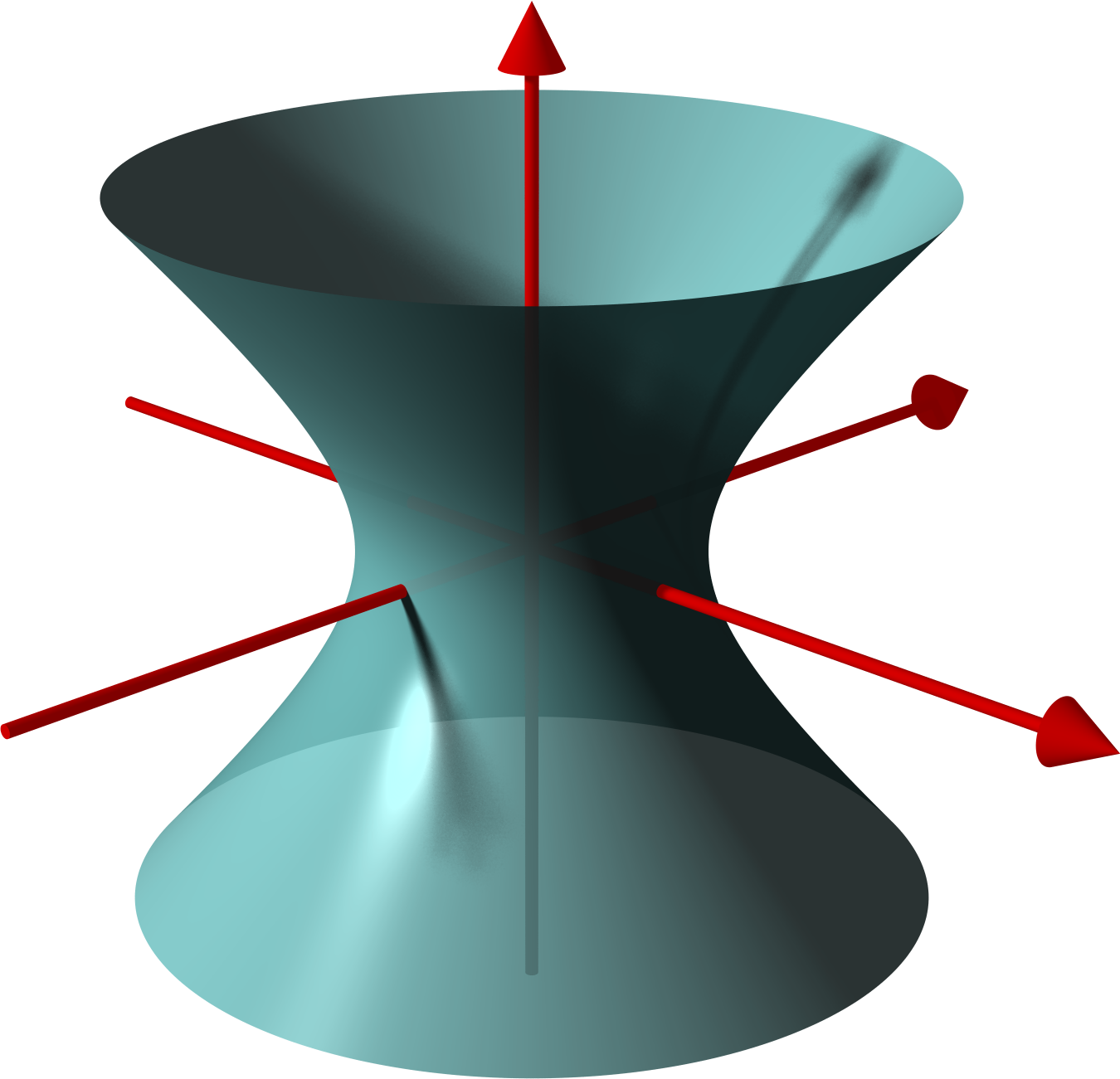
Hyperboloid of one sheet

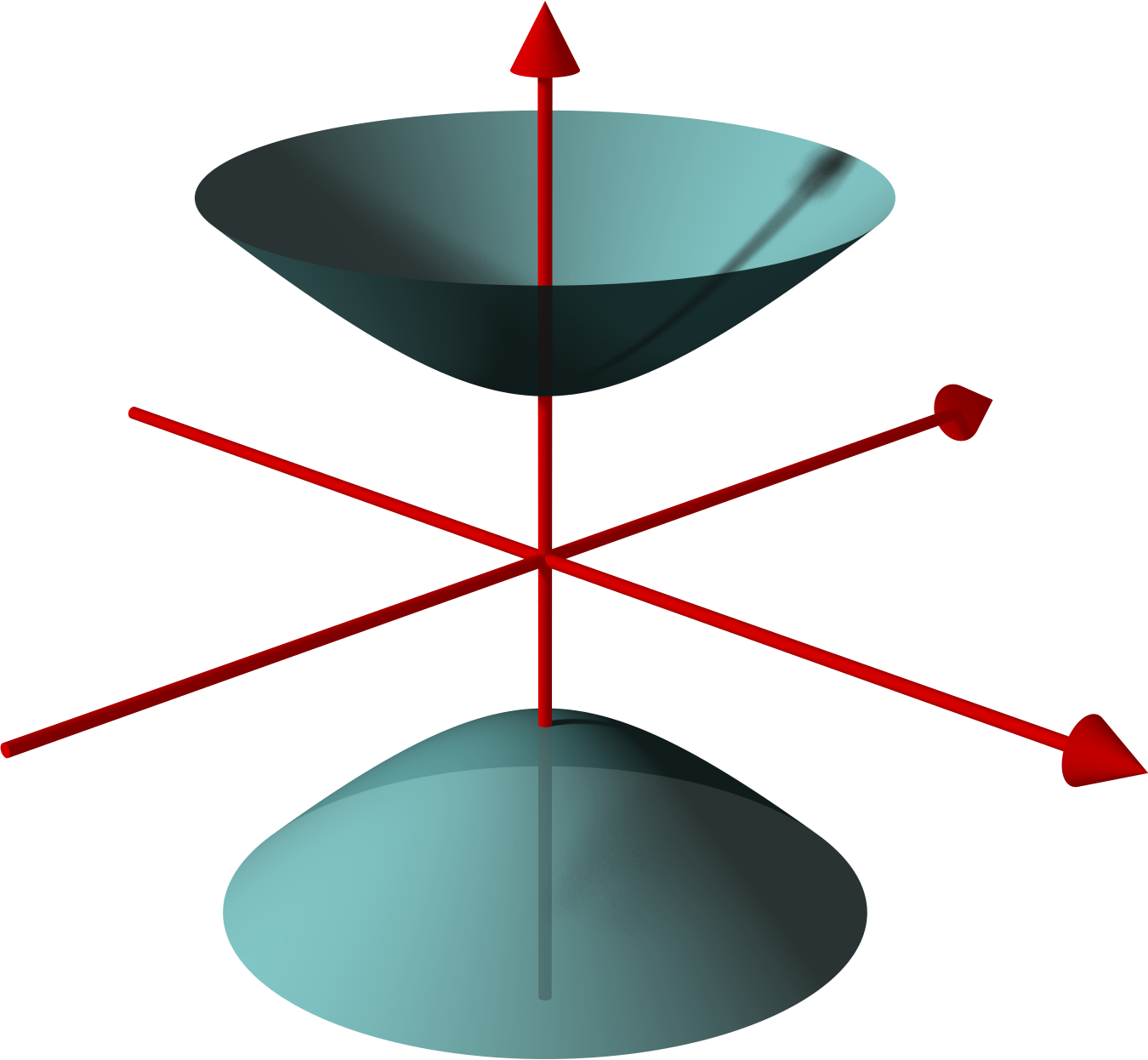
Hyperboloid of two sheets

== Applications ==
=== Physics ===
==== Elliptical reflectors and acoustics ====
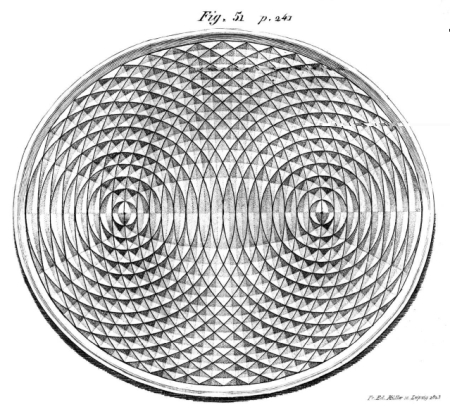
Wave pattern of a little droplet dropped into mercury in the foci of the ellipse

If the water's surface is disturbed at one focus of an elliptical water tank, the circular waves of that disturbance, after reflecting off the walls, converge simultaneously to a single point: the second focus. This is a consequence of the total travel length being the same along any wall-bouncing path between the two foci.

Similarly, if a light source is placed at one focus of an elliptic mirror, all light rays on the plane of the ellipse are reflected to the second focus. Since no other smooth curve has such a property, it can be used as an alternative definition of an ellipse. (In the special case of a circle with a source at its center all light would be reflected back to the center.) If the ellipse is rotated along its major axis to produce an ellipsoidal mirror (specifically, a prolate spheroid), this property holds for all rays out of the source. Alternatively, a cylindrical mirror with elliptical cross-section can be used to focus light from a linear fluorescent lamp along a line of the paper; such mirrors are used in some document scanners.

Sound waves are reflected in a similar way, so in a large elliptical room a person standing at one focus can hear a person standing at the other focus remarkably well. The effect is even more evident under a vaulted roof shaped as a section of a prolate spheroid. Such a room is called a whisper chamber. The same effect can be demonstrated with two reflectors shaped like the end caps of such a spheroid, placed facing each other at the proper distance. Examples are the National Statuary Hall at the United States Capitol (where John Quincy Adams is said to have used this property for eavesdropping on political matters); the Mormon Tabernacle at Temple Square in Salt Lake City, Utah; at an exhibit on sound at the Museum of Science and Industry in Chicago; in front of the University of Illinois at Urbana–Champaign Foellinger Auditorium; and also at a side chamber of the Palace of Charles V, in the Alhambra.

==== Planetary orbits ====
In the 17th century, Johannes Kepler discovered that the orbits along which the planets travel around the Sun are ellipses with the Sun [approximately] at one focus, in his first law of planetary motion. Later, Isaac Newton explained this as a corollary of his law of universal gravitation.

More generally, in the gravitational two-body problem, if the two bodies are bound to each other (that is, the total energy is negative), their orbits are similar ellipses with the common barycenter being one of the foci of each ellipse. The other focus of either ellipse has no known physical significance. The orbit of either body in the reference frame of the other is also an ellipse, with the other body at the same focus.

Keplerian elliptical orbits are the result of any radially directed attraction force whose strength is inversely proportional to the square of the distance. Thus, in principle, the motion of two oppositely charged particles in empty space would also be an ellipse. (However, this conclusion ignores losses due to electromagnetic radiation and quantum effects, which become significant when the particles are moving at high speed.)

For elliptical orbits, useful relations involving the eccentricity $e$ are:
$$\begin{align}
e &= \frac{r_a - r_p}{r_a + r_p} = \frac{r_a - r_p}{2a} \\
r_a &= (1 + e)a \\
r_p &= (1 - e)a
\end{align}$$

where

- $r_a$ is the radius at apoapsis, i.e., the farthest distance of the orbit to the barycenter of the system, which is a focus of the ellipse
- $r_p$ is the radius at periapsis, the closest distance
- $a$ is the length of the semi-major axis

Also, in terms of $r_a$ and $r_p$, the semi-major axis $a$ is their arithmetic mean, the semi-minor axis $b$ is their geometric mean, and the semi-latus rectum $\ell$ is their harmonic mean. In other words,
$$\begin{align}
a &= \frac{r_a + r_p}{2} \\[2pt]
b &= \sqrt{r_a r_p} \\[2pt]
\ell &= \frac{2}{\frac{1}{r_a} + \frac{1}{r_p}} = \frac{2r_ar_p}{r_a + r_p}.
\end{align}$$

==== Harmonic oscillators ====
The general solution for a harmonic oscillator in two or more dimensions is also an ellipse. Such is the case, for instance, of a long pendulum that is free to move in two dimensions; of a mass attached to a fixed point by a perfectly elastic spring; or of any object that moves under influence of an attractive force that is directly proportional to its distance from a fixed attractor. Unlike Keplerian orbits, however, these "harmonic orbits" have the center of attraction at the geometric center of the ellipse, and have fairly simple equations of motion.

==== Phase visualization ====
In electronics, the relative phase of two sinusoidal signals can be compared by feeding them to the vertical and horizontal inputs of an oscilloscope. If the Lissajous figure display is an ellipse, rather than a straight line, the two signals are out of phase.

==== Elliptical gears ====
Two non-circular gears with the same elliptical outline, each pivoting around one focus and positioned at the proper angle, turn smoothly while maintaining contact at all times. Alternatively, they can be connected by a link chain or timing belt, or in the case of a bicycle the main chainring may be elliptical, or an ovoid similar to an ellipse in form. Such elliptical gears may be used in mechanical equipment to produce variable angular speed or torque from a constant rotation of the driving axle, or in the case of a bicycle to allow a varying crank rotation speed with inversely varying mechanical advantage.

Elliptical bicycle gears make it easier for the chain to slide off the cog when changing gears.

An example gear application would be a device that winds thread onto a conical bobbin on a spinning machine. The bobbin would need to wind faster when the thread is near the apex than when it is near the base.

==== Optics ====
- In a material that is optically anisotropic (birefringent), the refractive index depends on the direction of the light. The dependency can be described by an index ellipsoid. (If the material is optically isotropic, this ellipsoid is a sphere.)
- In lamp-pumped solid-state lasers, elliptical cylinder-shaped reflectors have been used to direct light from the pump lamp (coaxial with one ellipse focal axis) to the active medium rod (coaxial with the second focal axis).
- In laser-plasma produced EUV light sources used in microchip lithography, EUV light is generated by plasma positioned in the primary focus of an ellipsoid mirror and is collected in the secondary focus at the input of the lithography machine.

=== Statistics and finance ===
In statistics, a bivariate random vector $(X, Y)$ is jointly elliptically distributed if its iso-density contours—loci of equal values of the density function—are ellipses. The concept extends to an arbitrary number of elements of the random vector, in which case in general the iso-density contours are ellipsoids. A special case is the multivariate normal distribution. The elliptical distributions are important in the financial field because if rates of return on assets are jointly elliptically distributed then all portfolios can be characterized completely by their mean and variance—that is, any two portfolios with identical mean and variance of portfolio return have identical distributions of portfolio return.

=== Computer graphics ===
Drawing an ellipse as a graphics primitive is common in standard display libraries, such as the MacIntosh QuickDraw API, and Direct2D on Windows. Jack Bresenham at IBM is most famous for the invention of 2D drawing primitives, including line and circle drawing, using only fast integer operations such as addition and branch on carry bit. M. L. V. Pitteway extended Bresenham's algorithm for lines to conics in 1967. Another efficient generalization to draw ellipses was invented in 1984 by Jerry Van Aken.

In 1970 Danny Cohen presented at the "Computer Graphics 1970" conference in England a linear algorithm for drawing ellipses and circles. In 1971, L. B. Smith published similar algorithms for all conic sections and proved them to have good properties. These algorithms need only a few multiplications and additions to calculate each vector.

It is beneficial to use a parametric formulation in computer graphics because the density of points is greatest where there is the most curvature. Thus, the change in slope between each successive point is small, reducing the apparent "jaggedness" of the approximation.

Drawing with Bézier paths

Composite Bézier curves may also be used to draw an ellipse to sufficient accuracy, since any ellipse may be construed as an affine transformation of a circle. The spline methods used to draw a circle may be used to draw an ellipse, since the constituent Bézier curves behave appropriately under such transformations.

=== Optimization theory ===
It is sometimes useful to find the minimum bounding ellipse on a set of points. The ellipsoid method is quite useful for solving this problem.

== See also ==
- Cartesian oval, a generalization of the ellipse
- Circumconic and inconic
- Distance of closest approach of ellipses
- Ellipse fitting
- Elliptic coordinates, an orthogonal coordinate system based on families of ellipses and hyperbolae
- Elliptic partial differential equation
- Elliptical distribution, in statistics
- Elliptical dome
- Focaloid
- Geodesics on an ellipsoid
- Great ellipse
- Kepler's laws of planetary motion
- n-ellipse, a generalization of the ellipse for n foci
- Oval
- Perimeter of an ellipse
- Spheroid, the ellipsoid obtained by rotating an ellipse about its major or minor axis
- Stadium (geometry), a two-dimensional geometric shape constructed of a rectangle with semicircles at a pair of opposite sides
- Steiner circumellipse, the unique ellipse circumscribing a triangle and sharing its centroid
- Superellipse, a generalization of an ellipse that can look more rectangular or more "pointy"
- True, eccentric, and mean anomaly
