= Perimeter of an ellipse =

An ellipse has two axes and two foci

Unlike most other elementary shapes, such as the circle and square, there is no closed-form expression for the perimeter of an ellipse. Throughout history, a large number of closed-form approximations and expressions in terms of integrals or series have been given for the perimeter of an ellipse.

== Exact value ==
=== Elliptic integral ===
An ellipse is defined by two axes: the major axis (the longest diameter) of length $2a$ and the minor axis (the shortest diameter) of length $2b$, where the quantities $a$ and $b$ are the lengths of the semi-major and semi-minor axes respectively. The exact perimeter $P$ of an ellipse is given by the integral
$$P=4a\int_{0}^{\pi/2} \sqrt{1-e^2\sin^2\theta}\ d\theta,$$
where $e$ is the eccentricity of the ellipse, defined as
$$e=\sqrt{1-\frac{b^2}{a^2}}.$$
If we define the function
$$E(x) = \int_{0}^{\pi/2} \sqrt{1-x \sin^2\theta}\ d\theta,$$
known as the complete elliptic integral of the second kind, the perimeter can be expressed in terms of that function simply as
$$P=4aE(e^2).$$
The integral used to find the perimeter does not have a closed-form solution in terms of elementary functions.

=== Infinite sums ===
Another solution for the perimeter, this time using the sum of an infinite series, is
$$P=
2a
\pi
\left(1-\sum_{n=1}^\infty
\frac{(2n)!^2}{(2^n\cdot n!)^4} \cdot
\frac{e^{2n}}{2n-1}
\right),$$
where $e$ is the eccentricity of the ellipse.

More rapid convergence may be obtained by expanding in terms of $h = (a-b)^2 / (a+b)^2$. Found by James Ivory, Bessel and Kummer, there are several equivalent ways to write it. The most concise is in terms of the binomial coefficient with $n = 1/2$, but it may also be written in terms of the double factorial or integer binomial coefficients:
$$\begin{align}
\frac{P}{\pi(a+b)}
&= \sum_{n=0}^\infty {1/2 \choose n}^2 h^n \\
&= \sum_{n=0}^\infty \left(\frac{(2n-3)!!}{(2n)!!}\right)^2 h^n \\
&= \sum_{n=0}^\infty \left(\frac{(2n-3)!!}{2^n n!}\right)^2 h^n \\
&= \sum_{n=0}^\infty \left(\frac{1}{(2n-1)4^n}\binom{2n}{n}\right)^2 h^n \\
&= 1 + \frac{h}{4} + \frac{h^2}{64} + \frac{h^3}{256} + \frac{25h^4}{16384} + \frac{49h^5}{65536} + \frac{441h^6}{2^{20}} + \frac{1089h^7}{2^{22}} + \cdots.
\end{align}$$
The coefficients are slightly smaller (by a factor of $2n-1$) than the preceding, but also $e^4/16 \le h \le e^4$ is numerically much smaller than $e^2$ except at $h = e = 0$ and $h = e = 1$. For eccentricities less than 0.5 ($h < 0.005$), the error is at the limits of double-precision floating-point after the $h^4$ term.

== Approximations ==
Exact evaluation of elliptic integrals may be impractical in some cases due to their computational complexity. As a result, several approximation methods have been developed over time.

=== Ramanujan's approximations ===
Indian mathematician Srinivasa Ramanujan proposed multiple approximations.

==== First approximation ====
$$P\approx\pi\left(3(a+b)-\sqrt{(3a+b)(a+3b)}\right).$$

==== Second approximation ====
$$P\approx\pi(a+b)\left(1+\frac{3h}{10+\sqrt{4-3h} }\right),$$
where $h=\frac{(a-b)^2}{(a+b)^2}$.

==== Final approximation ====
The final approximation in Ramanujan's notes was an improvement on his second approximation. It is regarded as one of his most mysterious equations.
$$\begin{align}
P
&\approx \pi\left( (a+b) \left(1+\frac{3h}{10+\sqrt{4-3h} }\right)+\varepsilon \right) \\
&\approx \pi\left( (a+b) + \frac{3(a-b)^{2}}{10(a+b)+\sqrt{a^{2}+14ab+b^{2}}}+\varepsilon\right)
\end{align}$$
where $\varepsilon \approx \dfrac{3ae^{20}}{2^{36}}$ and $e$ is the eccentricity of the ellipse.

Ramanujan did not provide any rationale for this formula.

Ramanujan Approximation Accuracy

Here is the Second Ramanujan Approximation formula:
$$P\approx\pi(a+b)\left(1+\frac{3h}{10+\sqrt{4-3h} }\right),$$
where $h=\frac{(a-b)^2}{(a+b)^2}$.

Now let P_{R}is a Second Ramanujan perimeter approximation value and P_{I}is an Ivory Perimeter value. A rough map of Ramanujan accuracy is found in the following Table, attached:

Some higher precision is found in documented deficit tables Ramanujan Deficit 1011, 1012,1013,1018P1 and 1018P2, attached:

Key: Let a≡1. The open sesame to all of this is that the semi-minor axis b=
$$\frac{1-\sqrt{h}}{1+\sqrt{h}} .$$
For example let a=1, h = 0.5. Then b≈0.171572875...a.

Errata: The semi-major axis b of Ramanujan Deficit 1013 is 0.2922212642709540 instead of 0.292221264270954 short as posted.

Ivory Shortcut

For those who get tired of double factorials the Ivory perimeters can be approximated with the Ivory Shortcut Tables I C, II P2 and III P, attached. These are full precision tables. Every approximated value is given in exactly the first twenty digits of the whole thing in final resolution. To find the approximate perimeter of any ellipse add the polynomials in the second column and multiply the sum by the product of pi (a+b).

Derivation of Ramanujan's approximations

Second Approximation

Ramanujan's second approximation formula follows from the series representation of the perimeter of an ellipse. The expansion of the general form,

$1+\frac{A h}{B+\sqrt{1-C h}}=1+\frac{A}{B+1}h+\frac{A C}{2 (B+1)^2}h^2+\frac{A C^2(B+3)}{8 (B+1)^3}h^3+\cdots,$

can be compared to the first three terms of the infinite series,

$\frac{P}{\pi(a+b)} = 1 + \frac{1}{4}h + \frac{1}{64}h^2 + \frac{1}{256}h^3 +\frac{25}{16384}h^4 + \frac{49}{65536}h^5 \cdots,$

to show that

$\frac{A}{B+1}=\frac{1}{4}, \quad \frac{A C}{2 (B+1)^2}=\frac{1}{64}, \quad \frac{A C^2(B+3)}{8 (B+1)^3}=\frac{1}{256}.$

Solving the system of equations, we find

$A=\frac{3}{2}, \quad B=5, \quad C=\frac{3}{4}.$

Substituting the values into the original equation and simplifying algebraically yields Ramanujan's second approximation formula. This formula is accurate up to the fourth coefficient of the series expansion for the perimeter of an ellipse.

Final Approximation

Mathematician Mark Villarino demonstrated that each coefficient in the series representation of Ramanujan's approximation, beyond the fourth, is less than that of the exact perimeter's series representation. He also proved that the error in Ramanujan's approximation is

$\varepsilon = \pi (a+b)\cdot\theta\left(\frac{a-b}{a+b}\right)\cdot\left(\frac{a-b}{a+b}\right)^{10}$

where $\theta$ is a monotonically increasing function on the interval $0 \le \frac{a-b}{a+b} \le 1$ and

$\frac{3}{2^{17}} < \theta\left( \frac{a-b}{a+b} \right) \le \frac{14}{11}\left(\frac{22}{7}-\pi\right).$

By taking $\theta$'s lower bound, substituting $\left(\frac{a-b}{a+b}\right)^{10}$ for the equivalent form $\left(\frac{1-\sqrt{1-e^2}}{1+\sqrt{1-e^2}}\right)^{10}$, and writing its truncated series representation $\left(\frac{e^2}{4}\right)^{10}$, one can reconstruct the error correction term Ramanujan used in his final approximation:

$\varepsilon \approx \pi (a+b)\cdot\left(\frac{3}{2^{17}}\right)\cdot\left(\frac{e^2}{4}\right)^{10}=\pi (a+b)\cdot\dfrac{3ae^{20}}{2^{36}}.$

A slightly more precise approximate form can be produced by leaving the $\left(\frac{a-b}{a+b}\right)^{10}$ term intact:

$P \approx \pi(a+b)\left(1+\frac{3h}{10+\sqrt{4-3h} }+ \frac{3h^5}{2^{17}}\right)$

where $h=\left(\frac{a-b}{a+b}\right)^2$.

== See also ==
- Meridian arc#Full meridian
- Ellipse#Circumference
