= Steiner ellipse =

Circumellipse of a triangle whose center is the triangle's centroid

The Steiner ellipse of an isosceles triangle. The three line segments inside the triangle are the triangle's medians, each bisecting a side. The medians coincide at the triangle's centroid, which is also the center of the Steiner ellipse.

In geometry, the Steiner ellipse of a triangle is the unique circumellipse (an ellipse that touches the triangle at its vertices) whose center is the triangle's centroid. It is also called the Steiner circumellipse, to distinguish it from the Steiner inellipse. Named after Jakob Steiner, it is an example of a circumconic. By comparison the circumcircle of a triangle is another circumconic that touches the triangle at its vertices, but is not centered at the triangle's centroid unless the triangle is equilateral.

The area of the Steiner ellipse equals the area of the triangle times $\frac{4 \pi}{3\sqrt{3}},$ and hence is 4 times the area of the Steiner inellipse. The Steiner ellipse has the least area of any ellipse circumscribed about the triangle.

The Steiner ellipse is the scaled Steiner inellipse (factor 2, center is the centroid). Hence both ellipses are similar (have the same eccentricity).

== Properties ==
Steiner ellipse of an equilateral (left) and isosceles triangle

- A Steiner ellipse is the only ellipse, whose center is the centroid $S$ of a triangle $ABC$ and contains the points $A,B,C$. The area of the Steiner ellipse is $\tfrac{4 \pi}{3\sqrt{3}}$-fold of the triangle's area.

Proof

A) For an equilateral triangle the Steiner ellipse is the circumcircle, which is the only ellipse, that fulfills the preconditions. The desired ellipse has to contain the triangle reflected at the center of the ellipse. This is true for the circumcircle. A conic is uniquely determined by 5 points. Hence the circumcircle is the only Steiner ellipse.

B) Because an arbitrary triangle is the affine image of an equilateral triangle, an ellipse is the affine image of the unit circle and the centroid of a triangle is mapped onto the centroid of the image triangle, the property (a unique circumellipse with the centroid as center) is true for any triangle.

The area of the circumcircle of an equilateral triangle is $\tfrac{4 \pi}{3\sqrt{3}}$-fold of the area of the triangle. An affine map preserves the ratio of areas. Hence the statement on the ratio is true for any triangle and its Steiner ellipse.

== Determination of conjugate points ==
An ellipse can be drawn (by computer or by hand), if besides the center at least two conjugate points on conjugate diameters are known. In this case

- either one determines by Rytz's construction the vertices of the ellipse and draws the ellipse with a suitable ellipse compass
- or uses an parametric representation for drawing the ellipse.

Steps for determining congugate points on a Steiner ellipse: 1) transformation of the triangle onto an isosceles triangle 2) determination of point $D$ which is conjugate to $C$ (steps 1–5) 3) drawing the ellipse with conjugate half diameters $SC, SD$

Let be $ABC$ a triangle and its centroid $S$. The shear mapping with axis $d$ through $S$ and parallel to $AB$ transforms the triangle onto the isosceles triangle $A'B'C'$ (see diagram). Point $C'$ is a vertex of the Steiner ellipse of triangle $A'B'C'$. A second vertex $D$ of this ellipse lies on $d$, because $d$ is perpendicular to $SC'$ (symmetry reasons). This vertex can be determined from the data (ellipse with center $S$ through $C'$ and $B'$, $|A'B'|=c$) by calculation. It turns out that

$$|SD|=\frac{c}{\sqrt{3}}\ .$$

Or by drawing: Using de la Hire's method (see center diagram) vertex $D$ of the Steiner ellipse of the isosceles triangle $A'B'C'$ is determined.

The inverse shear mapping maps $C'$ back to $C$ and point $D$ is fixed, because it is a point on the shear axis. Hence semi diameter $SD$ is conjugate to $SC$.

With help of this pair of conjugate semi diameters the ellipse can be drawn, by hand or by computer.

== Parametric representation and equation ==
Steiner ellipse of a triangle including the axes and vertices (purple)

Given: Triangle $\ A=(a_1,a_2),\; B=(b_1,b_2), \; C=(c_1,c_2)$
Wanted: Parametric representation and equation of its Steiner ellipse

The centroid of the triangle is $\ S=(\tfrac{a_1+b_1+c_1}{3},\tfrac{a_2+b_2+c_2}{3})\ .$

Parametric representation:

From the investigation of the previous section one gets the following parametric representation of the Steiner ellipse:

- $\ \vec x =\vec p(t)=\overrightarrow{OS}\; +\; \overrightarrow{SC}\; \cos t \;+\; \frac{1}{\sqrt{3}}\overrightarrow{AB}\; \sin t \; , \quad 0\le t <2\pi \; .$
- The four vertices of the ellipse are $\quad \vec p(t_0),\; \vec p(t_0\pm\frac{\pi}{2}),\; \vec p(t_0+\pi),\$ where $t_0$ comes from
  $$\cot (2t_0)= \frac{\vec f_1^{\, 2}-\vec f_2^{\, 2}}{2\vec f_1 \cdot \vec f_2}\quad$$
  with $\quad \vec f_1=\vec{SC},\quad \vec f_2=\frac{1}{\sqrt{3}}\vec{AB} \quad$ (see ellipse).

The roles of the points for determining the parametric representation can be changed.

Example (see diagram): $A=(-5,-5),B=(0,25), C=(20,0)$.

Steiner ellipse as example for "equation"

Equation:

If the origin is the centroid of the triangle (center of the Steiner ellipse) the equation corresponding to the parametric representation $\vec x=\vec f_1 \cos t + \vec f_2 \sin t$ is

- $\ (xf_{2y} - yf_{2x})^2 + (yf_{1x} - xf_{1y})^2 - (f_{1x}f_{2y} - f_{1y}f_{2x})^2 =0 \ ,$

with $\ \vec f_i=(f_{ix},f_{iy})^T \$.

Example: The centroid of triangle $\quad A=(-\tfrac{3}{2}\sqrt{3},-\tfrac{3}{2}),\ B=(\tfrac{\sqrt{3}}{2},-\tfrac{3}{2}),\ C=(\sqrt{3},3)\quad$ is the origin. From the vectors $\vec f_1=(\sqrt{3},3)^T,\ \vec f_2=(2,0)^T \$ one gets the equation of the Steiner ellipse:

$$9x^2+7y^2-6\sqrt{3} xy-36=0 \ .$$

== Determination of the semi-axes and linear eccentricity ==
If the vertices are already known (see above), the semi-axes can be determined. If one is interested in the axes and eccentricity only, the following method is more appropriate:

Let $a,b,\; a>b$, be the semi-axes of the Steiner ellipse. From Apollonios theorem on properties of conjugate semi diameters of ellipses one gets:

$$a^2+b^2=\vec{SC}^2+\vec{SD}^2 \ , \quad a\cdot b= \left|\det(\vec{SC},\vec{SD})\right| \ .$$

Denoting the right hand sides of the equations by $M$ and $N$ respectively and transforming the non linear system (respecting $a>b>0$) leads to:

$$a^2+b^2=M ,\ ab=N \quad \rightarrow \quad a^2+2ab+b^2=M+2N ,\ a^2-2ab+b^2=M-2N$$
$$\rightarrow\quad (a+b)^2=M+2N ,\  (a-b)^2=M-2N \quad \rightarrow\quad a+b=\sqrt{M+2N} ,\  a-b=\sqrt{M-2N}\ .$$

Solving for $a$ and $b$ one gets the semi-axes:

$$\ a=\frac{1}{2}(\sqrt{M+2N}+\sqrt{M-2N}) \ , \qquad b=\frac{1}{2}(\sqrt{M+2N}-\sqrt{M-2N})\ ,$$

with $\qquad M= \vec{SC}^2+\frac{1}{3}\vec{AB}^2\ , \quad N= \frac{1}{\sqrt{3}} \left|\det(\vec{SC},\vec{AB})\right| \ .$

The linear eccentricity of the Steiner ellipse is

$$c=\sqrt{a^2-b^2}=\sqrt{\sqrt{M^2-4N^2}}$$

and the area is
$$F=\pi ab=\pi N=\frac{\pi}{\sqrt{3}} \left|\det(\vec{SC},\vec{AB})\right|.$$

One should not confuse $a$ and $b$ in this section with other meanings in this article.

== Trilinear equation ==
The equation of the Steiner circumellipse in trilinear coordinates is

$$bcyz+cazx+abxy=0$$

for side lengths a, b, c.

== Alternative calculation of the semi axes and linear eccentricity ==
The semi-major and semi-minor axes (of a triangle with sides of length a, b, c) have lengths

$$\frac{1}{3}\sqrt{a^2+b^2+c^2 \pm 2Z},$$

and focal length

$$\frac{2}{3}\sqrt{Z}$$

where

$$Z=\sqrt{a^4+b^4+c^4-a^2b^2-b^2c^2-c^2a^2}.$$

The foci are called the Bickart points of the triangle.

== See also ==
- Triangle conic
