= Steiner inellipse =

Unique ellipse tangent to all 3 midpoints of a given triangle's sides

The Steiner inellipse. According to Marden's theorem, given the triangle with vertices (1, 7), (7, 5), (3, 1), the foci of the inellipse are (3, 5) and (13/3, 11/3), since $$\begin{align} & D_x(1+7i-x)(7+5i-x)(3+i-x) \\ & = -3\left(\tfrac{13}{3}+\tfrac{11}{3}i-x\right)(3+5i-x) \end{align}$$

In geometry, the Steiner inellipse, midpoint inellipse, or midpoint ellipse of a triangle is the unique ellipse inscribed in the triangle and tangent to the sides at their midpoints. It is an example of an inellipse. By comparison the inscribed circle and Mandart inellipse of a triangle are other inconics that are tangent to the sides, but not at the midpoints unless the triangle is equilateral. The Steiner inellipse is attributed by Dörrie to Jakob Steiner, and a proof of its uniqueness is given by Dan Kalman.

The Steiner inellipse contrasts with the Steiner circumellipse, also called simply the Steiner ellipse, which is the unique ellipse that passes through the vertices of a given triangle and whose center is the triangle's centroid.

== Definition and properties ==
Definition

An ellipse that is tangent to the sides of a triangle △ABC at its midpoints $M_1,M_2,M_3$ is called the Steiner inellipse of △ABC.

Arbitrary triangle △ABC Steiner inellipse Steiner ellipse Major and minor axes

Equilateral triangle △ABC Steiner inellipse Steiner ellipse

Properties:
For an arbitrary triangle △ABC with midpoints $M_1,M_2,M_3$ of its sides the following statements are true:
a) There exists exactly one Steiner inellipse.
b) The center of the Steiner inellipse is the centroid S of △ABC.
c1) The triangle $\triangle M_1M_2M_3$ has the same centroid S and the Steiner inellipse of △ABC is the Steiner ellipse of the triangle $\triangle M_1M_2M_3.$
c2) The Steiner inellipse of a triangle is the scaled Steiner Ellipse with scaling factor 1/2 and the centroid as center. Hence both ellipses have the same eccentricity, are similar.
d) The area of the Steiner inellipse is $\tfrac{\pi}{3 \sqrt{3}}$-times the area of the triangle.
e) The Steiner inellipse has the greatest area of all inellipses of the triangle.

Proof

The proofs of properties a),b),c) are based on the following properties of an affine mapping: 1) any triangle can be considered as an affine image of an equilateral triangle. 2) Midpoints of sides are mapped onto midpoints and centroids on centroids. The center of an ellipse is mapped onto the center of its image.
Hence its suffice to prove properties a),b),c) for an equilateral triangle:
a) To any equilateral triangle there exists an incircle. It touches the sides at its midpoints. There is no other (non-degenerate) conic section with the same properties, because a conic section is determined by 5 points/tangents.
b) By a simple calculation.
c) The circumcircle is mapped by a scaling, with factor 1/2 and the centroid as center, onto the incircle. The eccentricity is an invariant.
d) The ratio of areas is invariant to affine transformations. So the ratio can be calculated for the equilateral triangle.
e) See Inellipse.

== Parametric representation and semi-axes ==
Parametric representation:

- Because a Steiner inellipse of a triangle △ABC is a scaled Steiner ellipse (factor 1/2, center is centroid) one gets a parametric representation derived from the trigonometric representation of the Steiner ellipse :

$$\vec x =\vec p(t)=\overrightarrow{OS}\; +\; {\color{blue}\frac 1 2 }\overrightarrow{SC}\; \cos t \;+\; \frac{1}{{\color{blue}2}\sqrt{3}}\overrightarrow{AB}\; \sin t \; , \quad 0\le t <2\pi\ .$$

- The 4 vertices of the Steiner inellipse are

$$\vec p(t_0),\; \vec p(t_0\pm\frac{\pi}{2}),\; \vec p(t_0+\pi),$$

where t_{0} is the solution of

$\cot (2t_0)= \tfrac{\vec f_1^{\, 2}-\vec f_2^{\, 2}}{2\vec f_1 \cdot \vec f_2}\quad$ with $\quad \vec f_1=\frac 1 2 \vec{SC},\quad \vec f_2=\frac{1}{2\sqrt{3}}\vec{AB}\ .$

Semi-axes:

- With the abbreviations

$$\begin{align}
M &:= {\color{blue} \frac 1 4} \left(\vec{SC}^2+\frac{1}{3}\vec{AB}^2 \right) \\
N &:= \frac{1}{{\color{blue}4}\sqrt{3}} \left|\det \left(\vec{SC},\vec{AB} \right)\right|
\end{align}$$

one gets for the semi-axes a, b (where a > b):

$$\begin{align}
a &= \frac{1}{2} \left(\sqrt{M+2N}+\sqrt{M-2N} \right) \\
b &= \frac{1}{2} \left(\sqrt{M+2N}-\sqrt{M-2N} \right)\ .
\end{align}$$

- The linear eccentricity c of the Steiner inellipse is

$$c=\sqrt{a^2-b^2}=\dotsb=\sqrt{\sqrt{M^2-4N^2}}\ .$$

== Trilinear equation ==
The equation of the Steiner inellipse in trilinear coordinates for a triangle with side lengths a, b, c (with these parameters having a different meaning than previously) is

$$a^2x^2+b^2y^2+c^2z^2-2abxy-2bcyz-2cazx = 0$$

where x is an arbitrary positive constant times the distance of a point from the side of length a, and similarly for b and c with the same multiplicative constant.

== Other properties ==
The lengths of the semi-major and semi-minor axes for a triangle with sides a, b, c are

$$\frac{1}{6}\sqrt{a^2+b^2+c^2 \pm 2Z},$$

where

$$Z=\sqrt{a^4+b^4+c^4-a^2b^2-b^2c^2-c^2a^2}.$$

According to Marden's theorem, if the three vertices of the triangle are the complex zeros of a cubic polynomial, then the foci of the Steiner inellipse are the zeros of the derivative of the polynomial.

The major axis of the Steiner inellipse is the line of best orthogonal fit for the vertices.

Denote the centroid and the first and second Fermat points of a triangle as $G,F_+,F_-$ respectively. The major axis of the triangle's Steiner inellipse is the inner bisector of $\angle F_+GF_-.$ The lengths of the axes are $|GF_-| \pm |GF_+|\! ;$ that is, the sum and difference of the distances of the Fermat points from the centroid.

The axes of the Steiner inellipse of a triangle are tangent to its Kiepert parabola, the unique parabola that is tangent to the sides of the triangle and has the Euler line as its directrix.

The foci of the Steiner inellipse of a triangle are the intersections of the inellipse's major axis and the circle with center on the minor axis and going through the Fermat points.

As with any ellipse inscribed in a triangle △ABC, letting the foci be P and Q we have

$$\frac{\overline{PA} \cdot \overline{QA}}{\overline{CA} \cdot \overline{AB}} + \frac{\overline{PB} \cdot \overline{QB}}{\overline{AB} \cdot \overline{BC}} + \frac{\overline{PC} \cdot \overline{QC}}{\overline{BC} \cdot \overline{CA}} = 1.$$

== Graphical construction ==
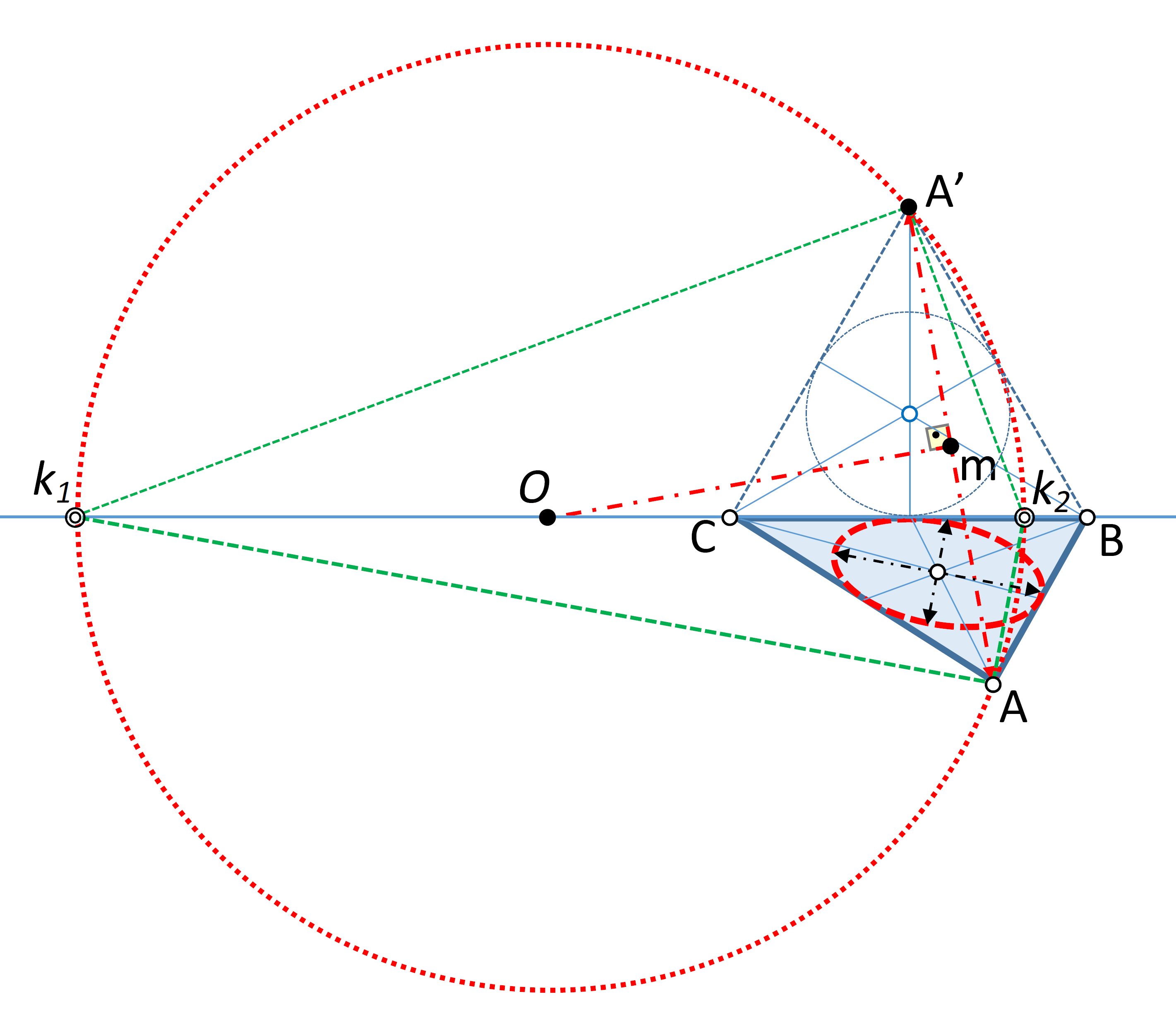
Graphical construction of the Steiner inellipse. Given triangle △ABC Equilaterial triangle △A'BC Line segment A̅'A̅ and its perpendicular bisector Circle centered at O Rays k̅_{1̅}A̅ and k̅_{2̅}A̅ Steiner inellipse

The Steiner inellipse of a triangle △ABC can be determined using a graphical construction based on establishing an affine transformation between the given triangle and an equilateral triangle. Since this projection preserves the midpoints of the sides, it allows for a graphical correspondence between the incircle of the equilateral triangle and the desired inellipse. The major and minor axes of an ellipse are always perpendicular. The construction uses a circle passing through A and A' (the original and transformed vertices) to find specific points k_{1} and k_{2} on the axis of affinity. The rays k̅_{1̅}A̅ and k̅_{2̅}A̅ identify the unique directions that remain perpendicular after the transformation, which must be the directions of the ellipse's semi-axes.

To perform the construction, one side of the triangle is taken as the axis of affinity. (If the triangle is equilateral, the problem is trivial as the inellipse is its incircle; if it is isosceles, one of the two equal sides is typically chosen).

The procedure is as follows:

1. Given △ABC, construct the equilateral triangle △A'BC on side BC.
2. Draw the segment A̅'A̅ (the direction of affinity with axis BC) between the two triangles.
3. From the midpoint m of A̅'A̅, draw the perpendicular bisector until it intersects the line BC (or its extension) at point O.
4. Draw the circle centered at O that passes through A' and A, which intersects the line BC at points k_{1} and k_{2}.
5. The direction of the ray k̅_{1̅}A̅ coincides with the major axis of the Steiner inellipse, and the ray k̅_{2̅}A̅ with the minor axis.
6. The endpoints of the semi-axes are obtained by projecting the points of the incircle of the equilateral triangle—specifically those where the tangents are parallel to rays k̅_{1̅}A̅' and k̅_{2̅}A̅' —it relies on the fact that affine transformations preserve parallelism between two lines in the same plane.

This same construction is applicable to the Steiner circumellipse, but uses the circumcircle of the equilateral triangle instead of the incircle.

== Generalization ==
The Steiner inellipse of a triangle can be generalized to n-gons: some n-gons have an interior ellipse that is tangent to each side at the side's midpoint. Marden's theorem still applies: the foci of the Steiner inellipse are zeroes of the derivative of the polynomial whose zeroes are the vertices of the n-gon.
