= Orthotransversal =

One of triangle line

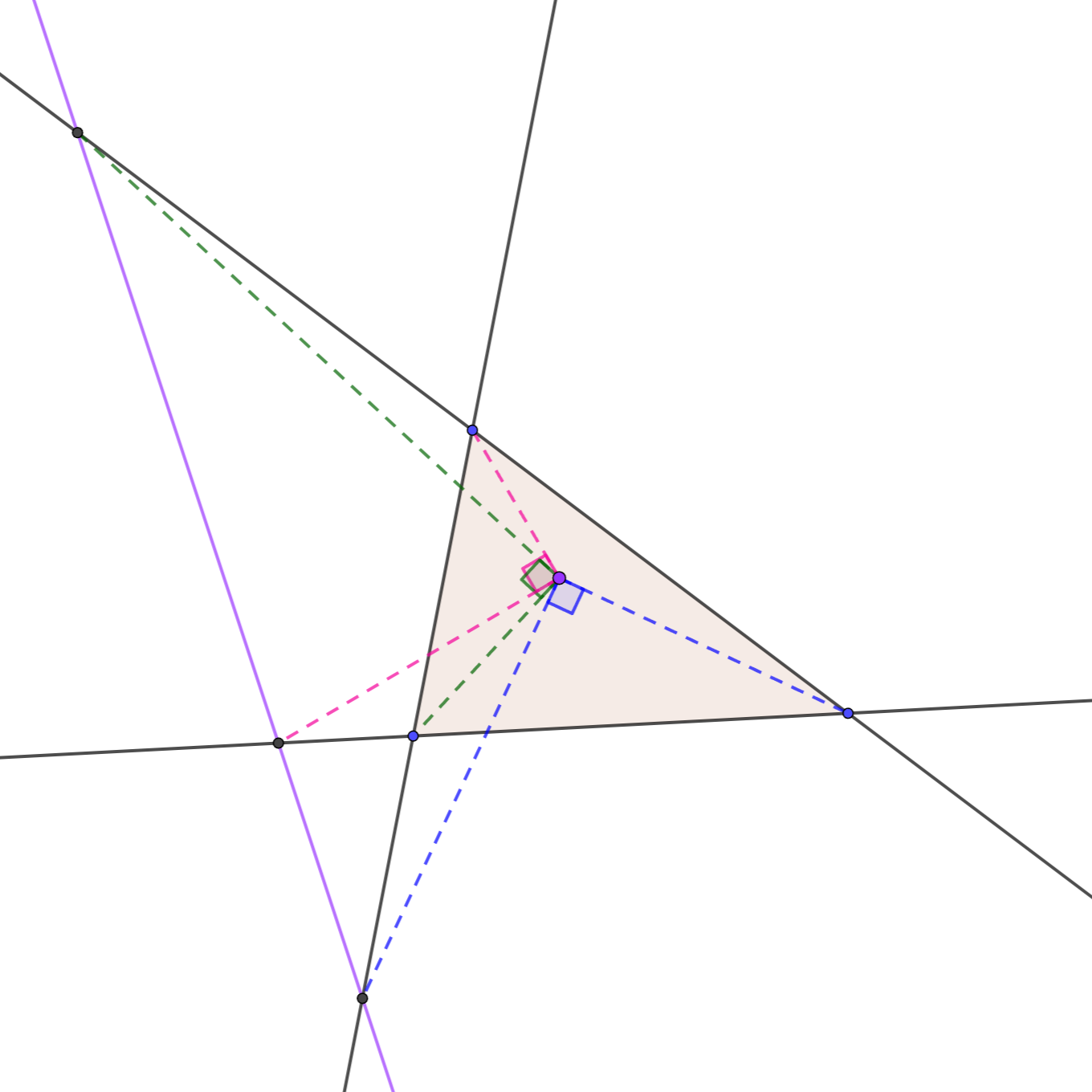
Orthotransversal

In Euclidean geometry, the orthotransversal of a point is the line defined as follows.

For a triangle ABC and a point P, three orthotraces, intersections of lines BC, CA, AB and perpendiculars of AP, BP, CP through P respectively are collinear. The line which includes these three points is called the orthotransversal of P. In 1933, Indian mathematician K. Satyanarayana called this line an "ortho-line".

Existence of it can proved by various methods such as a pole and polar, the dual of Desargues' involution theorem , and the Newton line theorem.

The tripole of the orthotransversal is called the orthocorrespondent of P, And the transformation P → P^{⊥}, the orthocorrespondent of P is called the orthocorrespondence.

== Example ==
- The orthotransversal of the Feuerbach point is the OI line.
- The orthotransversal of the Jerabek center is the Euler line.
- Orthocorrespondents of Fermat points are themselves.
- The orthocorrespondent of the Kiepert center X(115) is the focus of the Kiepert parabola X(110).

== Properties ==
- There are exactly two points which share the orthoccorespondent. This pair is called the antiorthocorrespondents.
- The orthotransversal of a point on the circumcircle of the reference triangle ABC passes through the circumcenter of ABC. Furthermore, the Steiner line, the orthotransversal, and the trilinear polar are concurrent.
- The orthotransversals of a point P on the Euler line is perpendicular to the line through the isogonal conjugate and the anticomplement of P.
- The orthotransversal of the nine-point center is perpendicular to the Euler line of the tangential triangle.
- For the quadrangle ABCD, 4 orthotransversals for each component triangles and each remaining vertexes are concurrent.
- Barycentric coordinates of the orthocorrespondent of P(p: q: r) are

$p(-pS_A+qS_B+rS_C)+a^2qr:q(pS_A-qS_B+rS_C)+b^2rp:r(pS_A+qS_B-rS_C)+c^2pq,$

where S_{A},S_{B},S_{C} are Conway notation.

== Orthopivotal cubic ==
The Locus of points P that P, P^{⊥}, and Q are collinear is a cubic curve. This is called the orthopivotal cubic of Q, O(Q). Every orthopivotal cubic passes through two Fermat points.

=== Example ===
- O(X_{2}) is the line at infinity and the Kiepert hyperbola.
- O(X_{3}) is the Neuberg cubic.
- The orthopivotal cubic of the vertex is the isogonal image of the Apollonius circle (the Apollonian strophoid).

== See also ==
- Orthocenter
- Orthopole
- Orthologic triangles
- Transversal
