= Equal parallelians point =

Triangle center

In geometry, the equal parallelians point (also called congruent parallelians point) is a special point associated with a plane triangle. It is a triangle center and it is denoted by X(192) in Clark Kimberling's Encyclopedia of Triangle Centers. There is a reference to this point in one of Peter Yff's notebooks, written in 1961.

== Definition ==
Reference triangle △ABC Line segments of equal length, parallel to the sidelines of △ABC

The equal parallelians point of triangle △ABC is a point P in the plane of △ABC such that the three line segments through P parallel to the sidelines of △ABC and having endpoints on these sidelines have equal lengths.

== Trilinear coordinates ==
The trilinear coordinates of the equal parallelians point of triangle △ABC are
$$bc(ca+ab-bc) \ : \  ca(ab+bc-ca) \ : \ ab(bc+ca-ab)$$

== Construction for the equal parallelians point ==
Construction of the equal parallelians point. Reference triangle △ABC Internal bisectors of △ABC (intersect opposite sides at A", B", C") Anticomplementary triangle △A'B'C' of △ABC Lines (A'A", B'B", C'C") concurrent at the equal parallelians point

Let △A'B'C' be the anticomplementary triangle of triangle △ABC. Let the internal bisectors of the angles at the vertices A, B, C of △ABC meet the opposite sidelines at A", B", C" respectively. Then the lines A'A", B'B", C'C" concur at the equal parallelians point of △ABC.

As a result, the equal parallelians point is the isotomic conjugate of the incenter of and with respect to the anticomplementary triangle.

== See also ==
- Congruent isoscelizers point
