= Congruent isoscelizers point =

Triangle center

In geometry, the congruent isoscelizers point is a special point associated with a plane triangle. It is a triangle center and it is listed as X(173) in Clark Kimberling's Encyclopedia of Triangle Centers. This point was introduced to the study of triangle geometry by Peter Yff in 1989.

== Definition ==
$\overline{P_1Q_1} = \overline{P_2Q_2} = \overline{P_3Q_3}$

An isoscelizer of an angle A in a triangle △ABC is a line through points P_{1} and Q_{1}, where P_{1} lies on AB and Q_{1} on AC, such that the triangle △AP_{1}Q_{1} is an isosceles triangle. An isoscelizer of angle A is a line perpendicular to the bisector of angle A.

Let △ABC be any triangle. Let P_{1}Q_{1}, P_{2}Q_{2}, P_{3}Q_{3} be the isoscelizers of the angles A, B, C respectively such that they all have the same length. Then, for a unique configuration, the three isoscelizers P_{1}Q_{1}, P_{2}Q_{2}, P_{3}Q_{3} are concurrent. The point of concurrence is the congruent isoscelizers point of triangle △ABC.

== Properties ==
Construction for congruent isoscelizers point. Reference triangle △ABC Congruent isoscelizers of △ABC Incircle of △ABC Intouch triangle △A'B'C' of △ABC Incircle of △A'B'C' (used to construct △A"B"C") Perspective lines between △ABC and △A"B"C"

- The trilinear coordinates of the congruent isoscelizers point of triangle △ABC are

$$\begin{array}{ccccc}
\cos\frac{B}{2} + \cos\frac{C}{2} - \cos\frac{A}{2} &:& \cos\frac{C}{2} + \cos\frac{A}{2} - \cos\frac{B}{2} &:& \cos\frac{A}{2} + \cos\frac{B}{2} - \cos\frac{C}{2} \\[4pt]
= \quad \tan\frac{A}{2} + \sec\frac{A}{2} \quad \ \ &:& \tan\frac{B}{2} + \sec\frac{B}{2} &:& \tan\frac{C}{2} + \sec\frac{C}{2}
\end{array}$$

- The intouch triangle of the intouch triangle of triangle △ABC is perspective to △ABC, and the congruent isoscelizers point is the perspector. This fact can be used to locate by geometrical constructions the congruent isoscelizers point of any given △ABC.

== See also ==
- Yff center of congruence
- Equal parallelians point
