= Kiepert =

- Friedrich Wilhelm August Ludwig Kiepert, German mathematician
- Heinrich Kiepert, German Geographer
- Richard Kiepert, German cartographer
