= Central line (geometry) =

Geometric property of certain lines with respect to a given triangle

In geometry, central lines are certain special straight lines that lie in the plane of a triangle. The special property that distinguishes a straight line as a central line is manifested via the equation of the line in trilinear coordinates. This special property is related to the concept of triangle center also. The concept of a central line was introduced by Clark Kimberling in a paper published in 1994.

== Definition ==
Let △ABC be a plane triangle and let x : y : z be the trilinear coordinates of an arbitrary point in the plane of triangle △ABC.

A straight line in the plane of △ABC whose equation in trilinear coordinates has the form
$$f(a,b,c)\,x + g(a,b,c)\,y + h(a,b,c)\,z = 0$$
where the point with trilinear coordinates
$$f(a,b,c) : g(a,b,c) : h(a,b,c)$$
is a triangle center, is a central line in the plane of △ABC relative to △ABC.

== Central lines as trilinear polars ==
The geometric relation between a central line and its associated triangle center can be expressed using the concepts of trilinear polars and isogonal conjugates.

Let $X = u(a,b,c) : v(a,b,c) : w(a,b,c)$ be a triangle center. The line whose equation is
$$\frac{x}{u (a,b,c)}  + \frac{y}{v(a,b,c)} + \frac{z}{w(a,b,c)}  = 0$$
is the trilinear polar of the triangle center X. Also the point
$$Y = \frac{1}{u(a,b,c)} : \frac{1}{v(a,b,c)} : \frac{1}{w(a,b,c)}$$
is the isogonal conjugate of the triangle center X.

Thus the central line given by the equation
$$f(a,b,c)\,x + g(a,b,c)\,y + h(a,b,c)\,z = 0$$
is the trilinear polar of the isogonal conjugate of the triangle center $f(a,b,c) : g(a,b,c) : h(a,b,c).$

The associated triangle center is known as the crossdifference of any two points on the central line.

== Construction of central lines ==

Let X be any triangle center of △ABC.

- Draw the lines AX, BX, CX and their reflections in the internal bisectors of the angles at the vertices A, B, C respectively.
- The reflected lines are concurrent and the point of concurrence is the isogonal conjugate Y of X.
- Let the cevians AY, BY, CY meet the opposite sidelines of △ABC at A', B', C' respectively. The triangle △A'B'C' is the cevian triangle of Y.
- The △ABC and the cevian triangle △A'B'C' are in perspective and let DEF be the axis of perspectivity of the two triangles. The line DEF is the trilinear polar of the point Y. DEF is the central line associated with the triangle center X.

== Some named central lines ==
Let X_{n} be the nth triangle center in Clark Kimberling's Encyclopedia of Triangle Centers. The central line associated with X_{n} is denoted by L_{n}. Some of the named central lines are given below.

Antiorthic axis as the axis of perspectivity of △ABC and its excentral triangle.

=== Central line associated with X_{1}, the incenter: Antiorthic axis ===
The central line associated with the incenter X_{1} = 1 : 1 : 1 (also denoted by I) is
$$x + y + z = 0.$$
This line is the antiorthic axis of △ABC.

- The isogonal conjugate of the incenter of △ABC is the incenter itself. So the antiorthic axis, which is the central line associated with the incenter, is the axis of perspectivity of △ABC and its incentral triangle (the cevian triangle of the incenter of △ABC).
- The antiorthic axis of △ABC is the axis of perspectivity of △ABC and the excentral triangle △I_{1}I_{2}I_{3} of △ABC.
- The triangle whose sidelines are externally tangent to the excircles of △ABC is the extangents triangle of △ABC. △ABC and its extangents triangle are in perspective and the axis of perspectivity is the antiorthic axis of △ABC.

=== Central line associated with X_{2}, the centroid: Lemoine axis ===
The trilinear coordinates of the centroid X_{2} (also denoted by G) of △ABC are:
$$\frac{1}{a} : \frac{1}{b} : \frac{1}{c}$$
So the central line associated with the centroid is the line whose trilinear equation is
$$\frac{x}{a} + \frac{y}{b} + \frac{z}{c} = 0.$$
This line is the Lemoine axis, also called the Lemoine line, of △ABC.

- The isogonal conjugate of the centroid X_{2} is the symmedian point X_{6} (also denoted by K) having trilinear coordinates a : b : c. So the Lemoine axis of △ABC is the trilinear polar of the symmedian point of △ABC.
- The tangential triangle of △ABC is the triangle △T_{A}T_{B}T_{C} formed by the tangents to the circumcircle of △ABC at its vertices. △ABC and its tangential triangle are in perspective and the axis of perspectivity is the Lemoine axis of △ABC.

=== Central line associated with X_{3}, the circumcenter: Orthic axis ===

The trilinear coordinates of the circumcenter X_{3} (also denoted by O) of △ABC are:
$$\cos A : \cos B : \cos C$$
So the central line associated with the circumcenter is the line whose trilinear equation is
$$x \cos A + y \cos B + z \cos C = 0.$$
This line is the orthic axis of △ABC.

- The isogonal conjugate of the circumcenter X_{3} is the orthocenter X_{4} (also denoted by H) having trilinear coordinates sec A : sec B : sec C. So the orthic axis of △ABC is the trilinear polar of the orthocenter of △ABC. The orthic axis of △ABC is the axis of perspectivity of △ABC and its orthic triangle △H_{A}H_{B}H_{C}. It is also the radical axis of the triangle's circumcircle and nine-point-circle.

=== Central line associated with X_{4}, the orthocenter ===

The trilinear coordinates of the orthocenter X_{4} (also denoted by H) of △ABC are:
$$\sec A : \sec B : \sec C$$
So the central line associated with the circumcenter is the line whose trilinear equation is
$$x \sec A + y \sec B + z \sec C = 0.$$

- The isogonal conjugate of the orthocenter of a triangle is the circumcenter of the triangle. So the central line associated with the orthocenter is the trilinear polar of the circumcenter.

=== Central line associated with X_{5}, the nine-point center ===

The trilinear coordinates of the nine-point center X_{5} (also denoted by N) of △ABC are:
$$\cos(B-C) : \cos(C-A) : \cos(A-B).$$
So the central line associated with the nine-point center is the line whose trilinear equation is
$$x \cos(B-C)  + y \cos(C-A) + z \cos(A-B) = 0.$$

- The isogonal conjugate of the nine-point center of △ABC is the Kosnita point X_{54} of △ABC. So the central line associated with the nine-point center is the trilinear polar of the Kosnita point.
- The Kosnita point is constructed as follows. Let O be the circumcenter of △ABC. Let O_{A}, O_{B}, O_{C} be the circumcenters of the triangles △BOC, △COA, △AOB respectively. The lines AO_{A}, BO_{B}, CO_{C} are concurrent and the point of concurrence is the Kosnita point of △ABC. The name is due to J Rigby.

=== Central line associated with X_{6}, the symmedian point : Line at infinity ===

The trilinear coordinates of the symmedian point X_{6} (also denoted by K) of △ABC are:
$$a : b : c$$
So the central line associated with the symmedian point is the line whose trilinear equation is
$$ax + by + cz = 0.$$

- This line is the line at infinity in the plane of △ABC.
- The isogonal conjugate of the symmedian point of △ABC is the centroid of △ABC. Hence the central line associated with the symmedian point is the trilinear polar of the centroid. This is the axis of perspectivity of the △ABC and its medial triangle.

== Some more named central lines ==
=== Euler line ===
The Euler line of △ABC is the line passing through the centroid, the circumcenter, the orthocenter and the nine-point center of △ABC. The trilinear equation of the Euler line is
$$x \sin 2A \sin(B-C) + y \sin 2B \sin(C-A) + z \sin 2C \sin(A-B) = 0.$$
This is the central line associated with the triangle center X_{647}.

=== Nagel line ===
The Nagel line of △ABC is the line passing through the centroid, the incenter, the Spieker center and the Nagel point of △ABC. The trilinear equation of the Nagel line is
$$xa(b-c) + yb(c-a) + zc(a-b) = 0.$$
This is the central line associated with the triangle center X_{649}.

=== Brocard axis ===
The Brocard axis of △ABC is the line through the circumcenter and the symmedian point of △ABC. Its trilinear equation is
$$x \sin(B-C) + y \sin(C-A) + z \sin(A-B) = 0.$$
This is the central line associated with the triangle center X_{523}.

=== Gergonne line ===
The Gergonne line of △ABC is the trilinear polar of the Gergonne point. It is perpendicular to the Soddy line of △ABC. Its trilinear equation is
$$x a(s-a) + y b(s-b) + z c(s-c) = 0,$$
where s is the semiperimeter of △ABC. This is the central line associated with the triangle center X_{55}.

== See also ==
- Trilinear polarity
- Triangle conic
- Modern triangle geometry
