= Central triangle =

Triangle related to a given triangle by two functions

In geometry, a central triangle is a triangle in the plane of the reference triangle. The trilinear coordinates of its vertices relative to the reference triangle are expressible in a certain cyclical way in terms of two functions having the same degree of homogeneity. At least one of the two functions must be a triangle center function. The excentral triangle is an example of a central triangle. The central triangles have been classified into three types based on the properties of the two functions.

== Definition ==
=== Triangle center function ===
A triangle center function is a real valued function $F(u,v,w)$ of three real variables u, v, w having the following properties:

- Homogeneity property: $F(tu,tv,tw) = t^n F(u,v,w)$ for some constant n and for all t > 0. The constant n is the degree of homogeneity of the function $F(u,v,w).$
- Bisymmetry property: $F(u,v,w) = F(u,w,v).$

=== Central triangles of Type 1 ===
Let $f(u,v,w)$ and $g(u,v,w)$ be two triangle center functions, not both identically zero functions, having the same degree of homogeneity. Let a, b, c be the side lengths of the reference triangle △ABC. An (f, g)-central triangle of Type 1 is a triangle △A'B'C' the trilinear coordinates of whose vertices have the following form: $\begin{array}{rcccccc} A' =& f(a,b,c) &:& g(b,c,a) &:& g(c,a,b) \\ B' =& g(a,b,c) &:& f(b,c,a) &:& g(c,a,b) \\ C' =& g(a,b,c) &:& g(b,c,a) &:& f(c,a,b) \end{array}$

=== Central triangles of Type 2 ===
Let $f(u,v,w)$ be a triangle center function and $g(u,v,w)$ be a function function satisfying the homogeneity property and having the same degree of homogeneity as $f(u,v,w)$ but not satisfying the bisymmetry property. An (f, g)-central triangle of Type 2 is a triangle △A'B'C' the trilinear coordinates of whose vertices have the following form: $\begin{array}{rcccccc} A' =& f(a,b,c) &:& g(b,c,a) &:& g(c,b,a) \\ B' =& g(a,c,b) &:& f(b,c,a) &:& g(c,a,b) \\ C' =& g(a,b,c) &:& g(b,a,c) &:& f(c,a,b) \end{array}$

=== Central triangles of Type 3 ===
Let $g(u,v,w)$ be a triangle center function. An g-central triangle of Type 3 is a triangle △A'B'C' the trilinear coordinates of whose vertices have the following form: $\begin{array}{rrcrcr} A' =& 0 \quad\ \ &:& g(b,c,a) &:& - g(c,b,a) \\ B' =& - g(a,c,b) &:& 0 \quad\ \ &:& g(c,a,b) \\ C' =& g(a,b,c) &:& - g(b,a,c) &:& 0 \quad\ \ \end{array}$

This is a degenerate triangle in the sense that the points A', B', C' are collinear.

== Special cases ==
If f = g, the (f, g)-central triangle of Type 1 degenerates to the triangle center A'. All central triangles of both Type 1 and Type 2 relative to an equilateral triangle degenerate to a point.

== Examples ==
=== Type 1 ===
- The excentral triangle of triangle △ABC is a central triangle of Type 1. This is obtained by taking $f(u,v,w) = -1,\ g(u,v,w) = 1.$
- Let X be a triangle center defined by the triangle center function $g(a,b,c).$ Then the cevian triangle of X is a (0, g)-central triangle of Type 1.
- Let X be a triangle center defined by the triangle center function $f(a,b,c).$ Then the anticevian triangle of X is a (−f, f)-central triangle of Type 1.
- The Lucas central triangle is the (f, g)-central triangle with $f(a,b,c) = a(2S+S_2), \quad g(a,b,c) = aS_A,$where S is twice the area of triangle ABC and $S_A = \tfrac{1}{2}(b^2 + c^2 - a^2).$

=== Type 2 ===
- Let X be a triangle center. The pedal and antipedal triangles of X are central triangles of Type 2.
- Yff Central Triangle
