= Friedrich Wilhelm August Ludwig Kiepert =

German mathematician (1846–1934)

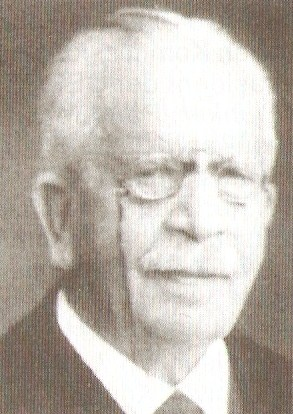
- Born: 6 October 1846; Wrocław, Polska
- Died: 5 September 1934; Hanover, Germany
- Scientific career
- Fields: Mathematics
- Workplaces: Technische Universität Darmstadt, Germany, Albert-Ludwigs-Universität Freiburg, Germany, Gottfried Wilhelm Leibniz Universität Hannover, Germany
- Doctoral advisor: Karl Theodor Wilhelm Weierstraß, Ernst Eduard Kummer

Notes
- German mathematician who introduced the Kiepert hyperbola.

Friedrich Wilhelm August Ludwig Kiepert (6 October 1846 – 5 September 1934) was a German mathematician who introduced the Kiepert hyperbola.

== Selected works ==
- De curvis quarum arcus integralibus ellipticis primi generis exprimuntur, 1870, dissertation
- Tabelle der wichtigsten Formeln aus der Differential-Rechnung, many editions
- Grundriss der Differential- und Integral-Rechnung, Helwing, Hannover, 2 vols., many editions
- Grundriss der Integral-Rechnung, 2 vols., many editions
- Grundriss der Differential-Rechnung, many editions

== See also ==
- Lemoine's problem
