= Antiparallel lines =

In geometry, two lines $l_1$ and $l_2$ are antiparallel with respect to a given line $m$ if they each make congruent angles with $m$ in opposite senses. More generally, lines $l_1$ and $l_2$ are antiparallel with respect to another pair of lines $m_1$ and $m_2$ if they are antiparallel with respect to the angle bisector of $m_1$ and $m_2.$

In any cyclic quadrilateral, any two opposite sides are antiparallel with respect to the other two sides.

Lines $l_1$ and $l_2$ are antiparallel with respect to the line $m$ if they make the same angle with $m$ in the opposite senses.

Given two lines $m_1$ and $m_2$, lines $l_1$ and $l_2$ are antiparallel with respect to $m_1$ and $m_2$ if $\angle 1 = \angle 2$.

Two lines $l_1$ and $l_2$ are antiparallel with respect to the sides of an angle $\angle APC$ if they make the same angle in the opposite senses with the bisector of that angle.

In any quadrilateral inscribed in a circle, any two opposite sides are antiparallel with respect to the other two sides.

== Relations ==
1. The line joining the feet to two altitudes of a triangle is antiparallel to the third side. (any cevians which 'see' the third side with the same angle create antiparallel lines)
2. The tangent to a triangle's circumcircle at a vertex is antiparallel to the opposite side.
3. The radius of the circumcircle at a vertex is perpendicular to all lines antiparallel to the opposite sides.

red angles are of equal size, ED and the tangent in B are antiparallel to AC and are perpendicular to MB

== Conic sections ==
In an oblique cone, there are exactly two families of parallel planes whose sections with the cone are circles. One of these families is parallel to the fixed generating circle and the other is called by Apollonius the subcontrary sections.

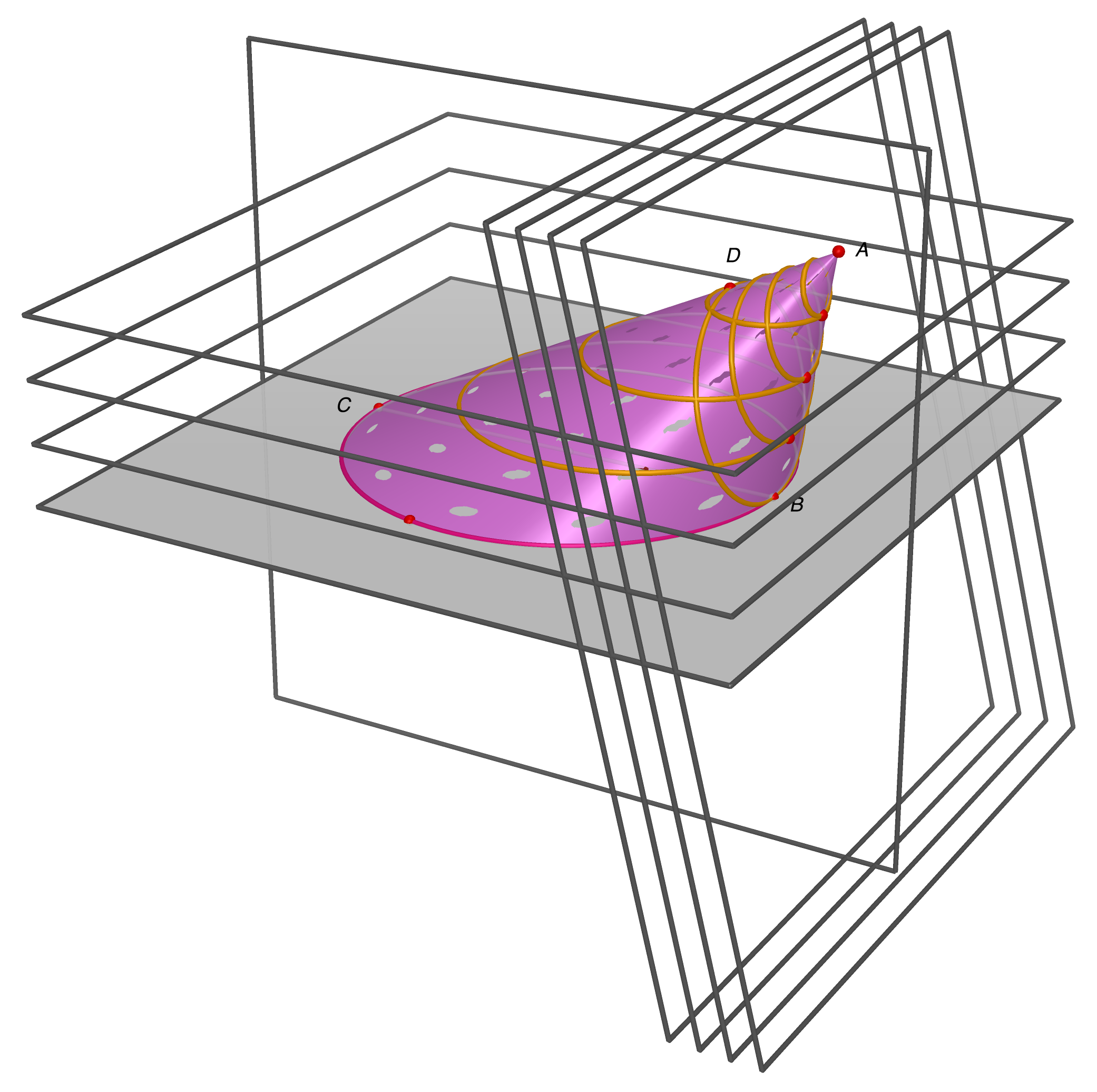
A cone with two directions of circular sections

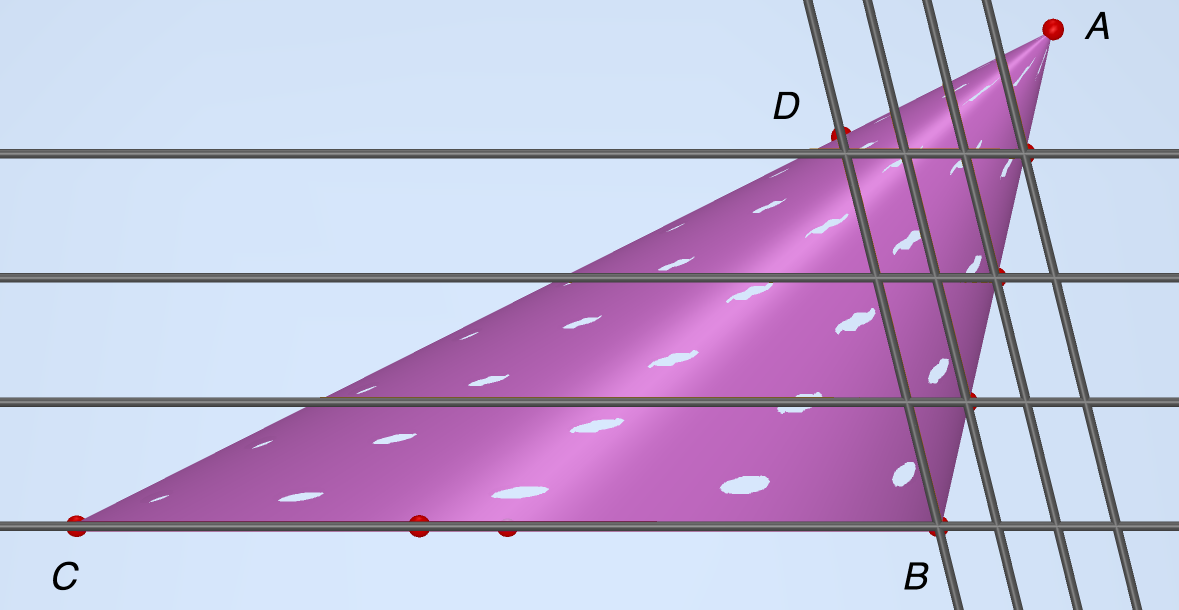
Side view of a cone with the two antiparallel directions of circular sections.

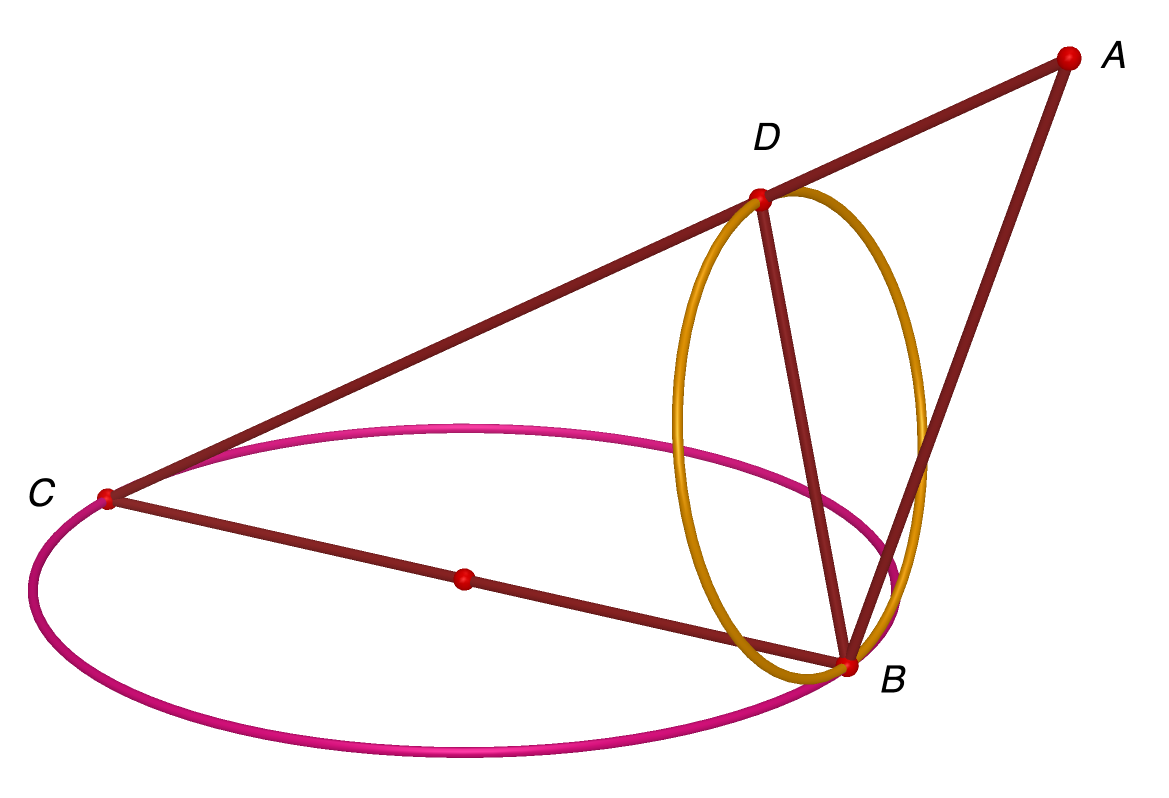
Triangles ABC and ADB are similar

If one looks at the triangles formed by the diameters of the circular sections (both families) and the vertex of the cone (triangles ABC and ADB), they are all similar. That is, if CB and BD are antiparallel with respect to lines AB and AC, then all sections of the cone parallel to either one of these circles will be circles. This is Book 1, Proposition 5 in Apollonius.
