= Orthopole =

Point constructed from a given triangle and line

Triangle △ABC Line ℓ Perpendiculars AA', BB', CC' Perpendiculars A'A", B'B", C'C" (intersect at orthopole H)

In geometry, the orthopole of a system consisting of a triangle △ABC and a line ℓ in the same plane is a point determined as follows:

- Let A', B', C' be the feet of perpendiculars dropped on ℓ from A, B, C respectively.
- Let A", B", C" be the feet of perpendiculars dropped from A', B', C' to the sides opposite A, B, C (respectively) or to those sides' extensions.
- Then the three lines A'A", B'B", C'C", are concurrent. The point at which they concur is the orthopole.

Due to their many properties, orthopoles have been the subject of a large literature. Some key topics are determination of the lines having a given orthopole and orthopolar circles.

== Literature ==
- Orthopole=Ортополюс. In Russian
