= Trilinear polarity =

Axis of perspectivity of a given triangle, its cevian triangle, and some point

In Euclidean geometry, trilinear polarity is a correspondence defined using a special case of perspective triangles. It is between the points (poles) in the plane of a triangle not lying on the sides of the triangle and lines (polars) in the plane of the triangle not passing through the vertices of the triangle. "Although it is called a polarity, it is not really a polarity at all, for poles of concurrent lines are not collinear points." It was Jean-Victor Poncelet (1788–1867), a French engineer and mathematician, who introduced the idea of the trilinear polar of a point in 1865.

== Definitions ==
Construction of a trilinear polar of a point P Given triangle △ABC Cevian triangle △DEF of △ABC from P Cevian lines which intersect at P Constructed trilinear polar (line XYZ)

Let △ABC be a plane triangle and let P be any point in the plane of the triangle not lying on the sides of the triangle. Briefly, the trilinear polar of P is the axis of perspectivity of the cevian triangle of P and the triangle △ABC.

In detail, let the line AP, BP, CP meet the sidelines BC, CA, AB at D, E, F respectively. Triangle △DEF is the cevian triangle of P with reference to triangle △ABC. Let the pairs of line (BC, EF), (CA, FD), (DE, AB) intersect at X, Y, Z respectively. By Desargues' theorem, the points X, Y, Z are collinear. The line of collinearity is the axis of perspectivity of triangle △ABC and triangle △DEF. The line XYZ is the trilinear polar of the point P.

The points X, Y, Z can also be obtained as the harmonic conjugates of D, E, F with respect to the pairs of points (B, C), (C, A), (A, B) respectively. Poncelet used this idea to define the concept of trilinear polars.

If the line L is the trilinear polar of the point P with respect to the reference triangle △ABC then P is called the trilinear pole of the line L with respect to the reference triangle △ABC.

== Trilinear equation ==
Let the trilinear coordinates of the point P be p : q : r. Then the trilinear equation of the trilinear polar of P is

$$\frac{x}{p} + \frac{y}{q} + \frac{z}{r} = 0.$$

== Construction of the trilinear pole ==
Construction of a trilinear pole of a line XYZ Given trilinear polar (line XYZ) Given triangle △ABC Cevian triangle △UVW of △ABC from XYZ Cevian lines, which intersect at the trilinear pole P

The reverse construction instead proceeds by constructing the anticevian triangle of P.

Let the line L meet the sides BC, CA, AB of triangle △ABC at X, Y, Z respectively. Let the pairs of lines (BY, CZ), (CZ, AX), (AX, BY) meet at U, V, W. Triangles △ABC and △UVW are in perspective and let P be the center of perspectivity. P is the trilinear pole of the line L.

== Some trilinear polars ==
Some of the trilinear polars are well known.

- The trilinear polar of the centroid of triangle △ABC is the line at infinity.
- The trilinear polar of the symmedian point is the Lemoine axis of triangle △ABC.
- The trilinear polar of the orthocenter is the orthic axis.
- Trilinear polars are not defined for points coinciding with the vertices of triangle △ABC.

== Poles of pencils of lines ==
Animation illustrating the fact that the locus of the trilinear poles of a pencil of lines passing through a fixed point K is a circumconic of the reference triangle.

Let P with trilinear coordinates X : Y : Z be the pole of a line passing through a fixed point K with trilinear coordinates x_{0} : y_{0} : z_{0}. Equation of the line is

$$\frac{x}{X} + \frac{y}{Y} + \frac{z}{Z} = 0.$$

Since this passes through K,

$$\frac{x_0}{X} + \frac{y_0}{Y} + \frac{z_0}{Z} = 0.$$

Thus the locus of P is

$$\frac{x_0}{x} + \frac{y_0}{y} + \frac{z_0}{z} = 0.$$

This is a circumconic of the triangle of reference △ABC. Thus the locus of the poles of a pencil of lines passing through a fixed point K is a circumconic E of the triangle of reference.

It can be shown that K is the perspector of E, namely, where △ABC and the polar triangle with respect to E are perspective. The polar triangle is bounded by the tangents to E at the vertices of △ABC. For example, the Trilinear polar of a point on the circumcircle must pass through its perspector, the Symmedian point X(6).
