= Hyperbola (disambiguation) =

A hyperbola is a type of smooth curve lying in a plane.

Hyperbola may also refer to:

- Hesperorhipis hyperbola, a species of metallic wood-boring beetles
- Hyperbola-1, a Chinese satellite launch vehicle
- Hyperbola GNU/Linux-libre, a fully free Linux distribution

== Geometry ==
- Conjugate hyperbola, symmetric figure defined by a hyperbola
- Feuerbach hyperbola, unique curve associated with every triangle
- Nine-point hyperbola, hyperbola constructed from a given triangle and point
- Unit hyperbola, geometric figure

== See also ==
- Hyperbolic (disambiguation)
