= GEOS =

GEOS may refer to:

== Computer software ==
- GEOS (8-bit operating system), an operating system originally designed for the Commodore 64
- GEOS (16-bit operating system), a DOS-based graphical user interface and x86 operating system
- GEOS (securities processing software), an integrated online system for the management and processing of securities
- GEOS (software library), an open-source geometry engine
- Goddard Earth Observing System, an Earth system model

== Other ==
- GEOS (eikaiwa), a defunct operator of English conversation teaching schools based in Japan
- GEOS circle, an intersection of four lines that are associated with a generalized triangle
- GEOS (satellite), a research satellite from ESRO (1978–1982)
- GEOS (satellite series), three research satellites from NASA
- Groupe GEOS, a French business consultancy
