= Morley's theorem =

Morley's theorem may refer to:

- Morley's trisector theorem, a theorem in geometry, discovered by Frank Morley
- Morley's categoricity theorem, a theorem in model theory, discovered by Michael D. Morley
