= Cosgrove Aqueduct =

Canal bridge over the Great Ouse

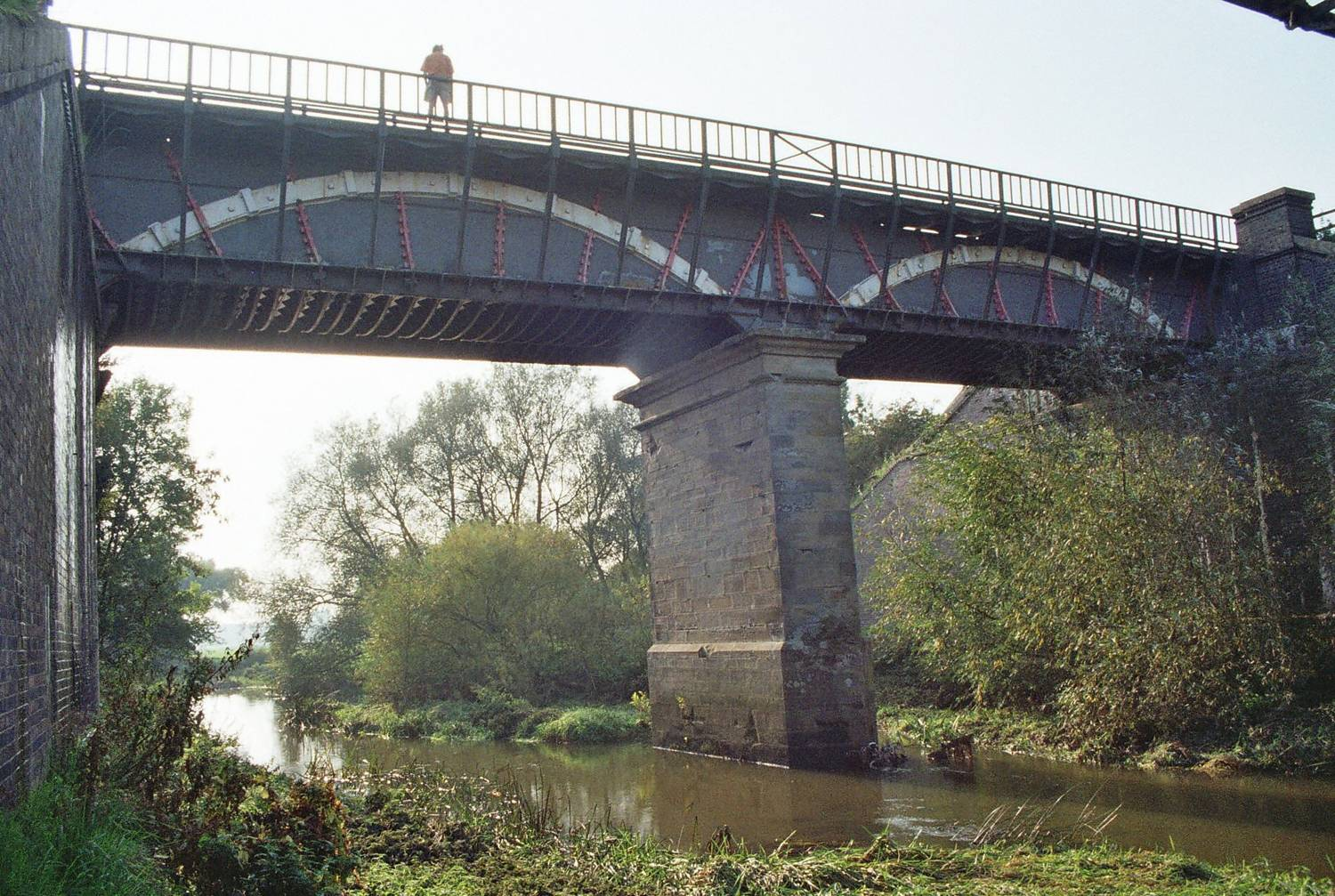
- The Cosgrove aqueduct
- Coordinates: 52.0687°N 0.8336°W
- OS grid reference: SP800417
- Carries: Grand Union Canal
- Crosses: River Great Ouse
- Locale: Cosgrove
- Maintained by: British Waterways

Characteristics
- Trough construction: cast iron
- Pier construction: Brick
- Total length: 101 feet (31 m)
- Width: 15 feet (4.6 m)
- Height: 60 feet (18 m)
- Water depth: 6 feet 6 inches (1.98 m)
- Traversable?: 15 ft, but in a Narrowboats-only canal section
- Towpaths: NE Side
- No. of spans: Two
- Piers in water: One

History
- Designer: Benjamin Bevan
- Opened: 26 August 1805
- Rebuilt: January 1811

Cosgrove aqueduct is a navigable cast iron trough navigable aqueduct that carries the Grand Union Canal over the River Great Ouse, on the borders between Buckinghamshire and Northamptonshire at the northwest margin of Milton Keynes in England. The present structure was built in 1811, to replace a previous brick structure that had failed. When the present structure was erected, it was known as the "Iron Trunk". The structure has two cast iron trough spans, with a single central masonry pier. The abutments were constructed in masonry but have been refaced in brick during the twentieth century. The trough is 15 feet (4.6 m) wide, 6 ft 6 in (1.98 m) deep, with a total length of 101 feet (31 m). The canal surface is about 40 feet (12 m) above the surface of the river. There are large approach earthworks about 36 feet (11 m) high above the valley floor and 150 feet (46 m) wide, with a total length of half a mile (800m).

== Origins ==
The Grand Junction Canal (later absorbed into the Grand Union Canal) required to cross the course of the River Great Ouse, the lowest point between the summits at Tring and Braunston. Initially flights of locks, four at the southeast and five at the northwest, were used to allow the canal to descend to cross the river on the level, and this arrangement came into action in 1800. However William Jessop, the canal company’s engineer, designed a three-arch brick viaduct so that the canal could cross at a higher level, reducing the water loss and delay in locking down to river level. His structure was opened on 26 August 1805, but a section of the canal embankment collapsed in January 1806; this was repaired, but the aqueduct structure itself collapsed in February 1808, severing the canal.

Although Jessop is sometimes blamed for the failure of the first structure, the collapse actually led to a legal dispute with the original contractor. The issue went to trial, with damages eventually being awarded to the Grand Junction Company for loss of trade while the canal was out of action, and the cost of the replacement aqueduct.

== The second structure ==
As a temporary measure the lock system originally installed was brought back into use, and Benjamin Bevan, an engineer employed by the canal company, designed a replacement structure. By this time, cast iron trough aqueducts designed by Thomas Telford for the Pontcysyllte Aqueduct and elsewhere, had become proven, and Bevan adopted the system for his structure. However, the canal was then operating as a wide canal in contradistinction to some northern narrowboat canals, so that the troughs had to be substantially larger and stronger than elsewhere. The cast iron units were cast at the Ketley foundry at Coalbrookdale; the company had already been involved with Telford on the Longdon-on-Tern Aqueduct. They were transported to Cosgrove by the canal itself, and assembled and erected at site. The new structure was completed in January 1811.

== Structural details ==
To resist the substantial additional loading of a wide canal, Bevan designed the floor sections to be arched, providing additional strength; in addition there are arch ribs built in with the trough side plates to give additional shear strength The towpath is cantilevered from one side, as at Froncysyllte, and supported by diagonal struts. There is a cattle creep in the embankment either side of the main structure, which is used by pedestrians.

== See also ==
- Canals of the United Kingdom
- History of the British canal system
- Wolverton Viaduct – Bridge carrying WCML over the Great Ouse
