= Feuerbach hyperbola =

Unique curve associated with every triangle

Feuerbach Hyperbola

In geometry, the Feuerbach hyperbola is a rectangular hyperbola passing through important triangle centers such as the incenter, orthocenter, Gergonne point, Nagel point, mittenpunkt and Schiffler point. The center of the hyperbola is the Feuerbach point, the point of tangency of the incircle and the nine-point circle.

== Equation ==
It has the trilinear equation $\frac{\cos B - \cos C}{\alpha}+ \frac{\cos C - \cos A}{\beta}+ \frac{\cos A - \cos B}{\gamma} = 0$ (here $A,B,C$ are the angles at the respective vertices and $(\alpha,\beta,\gamma)$ are the trilinear coordinates).

== Properties ==
Like other rectangular hyperbolas, the orthocenter of any three points on the curve lies on the hyperbola. So, the orthocenter of the triangle $ABC$ lies on the curve.

The line $OI$ is tangent to this hyperbola at $I$.

=== Isogonal conjugate of OI ===
The hyperbola is the isogonal conjugate of $OI$, the line joining the circumcenter and the incenter. This fact leads to a few interesting properties. Specifically all the points lying on the line $OI$ have their isogonal conjugates lying on the hyperbola. The Nagel point lies on the curve since its isogonal conjugate is the point of concurrency of the lines joining the vertices and the opposite Mixtilinear incircle touchpoints, also the in-similitude of the incircle and the circumcircle. Similarly, the Gergonne point lies on the curve since its isogonal conjugate is the ex-similitude of the incircle and the circumcircle.

The pedal circle of any point on the hyperbola passes through the Feuerbach point, the center of the hyperbola.

== Kariya's theorem ==
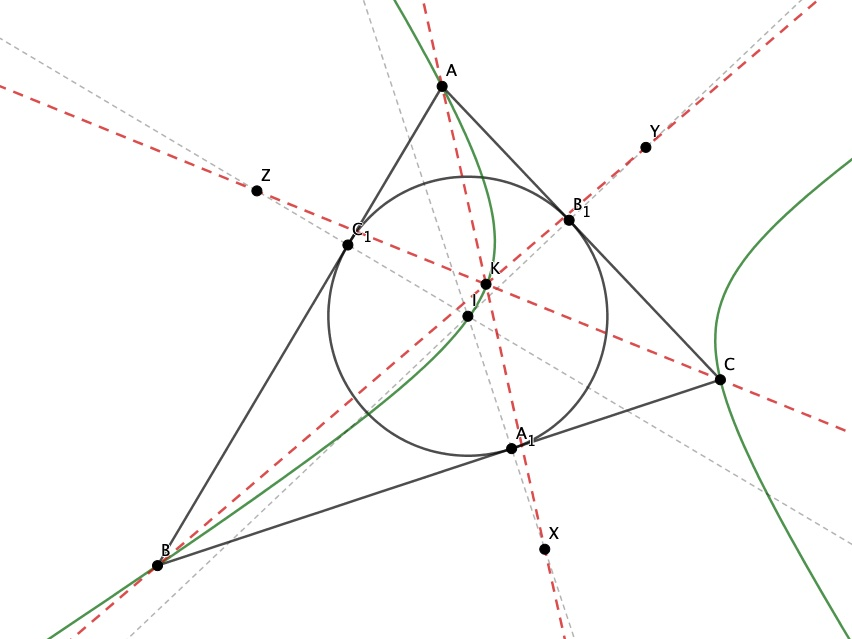
Kariya's theorem

Given a triangle $ABC$, let $A_1,B_1,C_1$ be the touchpoints of the incircle $\odot I$ with the sides of the triangle opposite to vertices $A,B,C$ respectively. Let $X,Y,Z$ be points lying on the lines $IA_1, IB_1,IC_1$ such that $IX=IY= IZ$. Then, the lines $AX,BY,CZ$ are concurrent at a point lying on the Feuerbach hyperbola.

The Kariya's theorem has a long history. It was proved independently by Auguste Boutin and V. Retali., but it became famous only after Kariya's paper. Around that time, many generalizations of this result were given. Kariya's theorem can be used for the construction of the Feuerbach hyperbola.

Both Lemoine's theorem and Kariya's theorem are a special case of Jacobi's theorem.

== See also ==
=== Other rectangular hyperbolas ===
- Kiepert hyperbola, the unique conic which passes through a triangle's three vertices, its centroid, and its orthocenter
- Jeřábek hyperbola, a rectangular hyperbola centered on a triangle's nine-point circle and passing through the triangle's three vertices as well as its circumcenter, orthocenter, and various other notable centers
