= GEOS circle =

Intersection of four lines associated with a generalized triangle

In geometry, the GEOS circle is derived from the intersection of four lines that are associated with a generalized triangle: the Euler line, the Soddy line, the orthic axis and the Gergonne line. Note that the Euler line is orthogonal to the orthic axis and that the Soddy line is orthogonal to the Gergonne line.

These four lines provide six points of intersection of which two points occur at line intersections that are orthogonal. Consequently, the other four points form an orthocentric system.

The GEOS circle is that circle centered at a point equidistant from X650 (the intersection of the orthic axis with the Gergonne line) and X20 (the intersection of the Euler line with the Soddy line and is known as the de Longchamps point) and passes through these points as well as the two points of orthogonal intersection.

The orthogonal intersection points are X468 (the intersection of the orthic axis with the Euler line) and X1323 (the Fletcher point, the intersection of the Gergonne line with the Soddy line).

The orthocentric system comprises X650, X20, X1375 (the intersection of the Euler line with the Gergonne line and is known as the Evans point) and X3012 (the intersection of the Soddy line and the orthic axis).

The X(i) point notation is the Clark Kimberling ETC classification of triangle centers.
