= William Jessop =

British civil engineer (1745-1814)

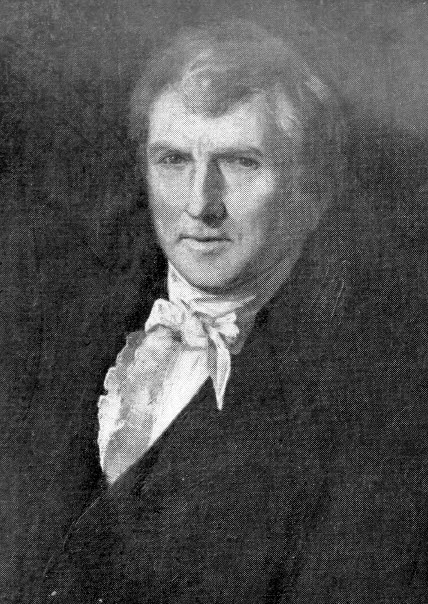
- Born: 23 January 1745; Devonport, Plymouth, England
- Died: 8 November 1814 (aged 69); Butterley Hall, Ripley, Derbyshire, England
- Occupation: Civil Engineer
- Known for: His Work on Canals, Cromford Canal, West India Docks Oxford Canal, Grand Canal (Ireland), Dublin

William Jessop (23 January 1745 – 18 November 1814) was an English civil engineer, best known for his work on canals, harbours and early railways in the late 18th and early 19th centuries.

== Early life ==
Jessop was born in Devonport, Devon, the son of Josias Jessop, a foreman shipwright in the Naval Dockyard. Josias Jessop was responsible for the repair and maintenance of Rudyerd's Tower, a wooden lighthouse on the Eddystone Rock. He carried out this task for twenty years until 1755, when the lighthouse burnt down. John Smeaton, a leading civil engineer, drew up plans for a new stone lighthouse and Josias became responsible for the overseeing the building work. The two men became close friends, and when Josias died in 1761, two years after the completion of the lighthouse, William Jessop was taken on as a pupil by Smeaton (who also acted as Jessop's guardian), working on various canal schemes in Yorkshire.

Jessop worked as Smeaton's assistant for a number of years before beginning to work as an engineer in his own right. He assisted Smeaton with the Calder and Hebble and the Aire and Calder navigations in Yorkshire.

== Grand Canal of Ireland ==
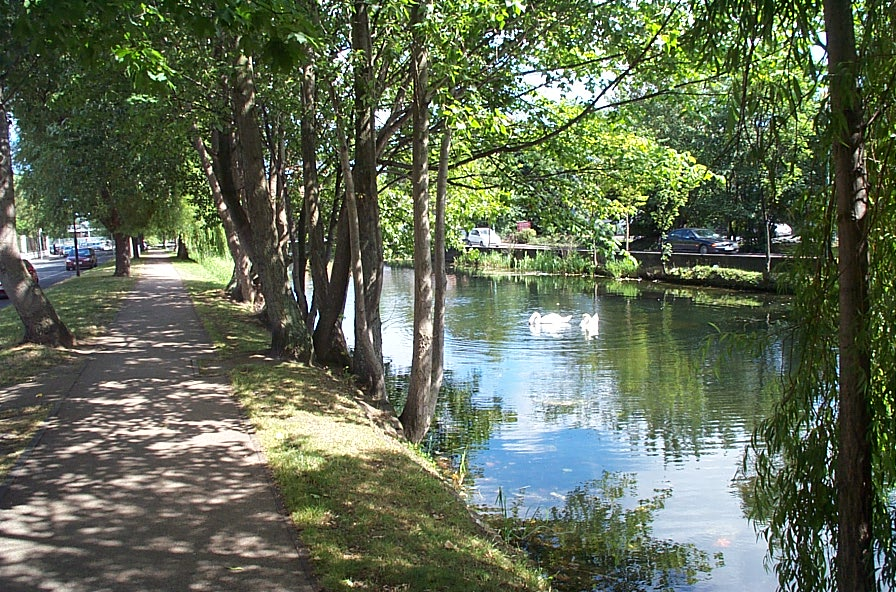
The Grand Canal in Dublin.

The first major work that Jessop is known to have carried out was the Grand Canal of Ireland. This had begun as a Government project in 1753, and it had taken seventeen years to build fourteen miles (23 km) of canal from the Dublin end. In 1772 a private company was formed to complete the canal, and consulted John Smeaton. Smeaton sent Jessop to take control of the project as principal engineer. Jessop re-surveyed the proposed line of the canal and carried the canal over the River Liffey, via the Leinster Aqueduct. He also drove the canal across the great Bog of Allen, a feat comparable with George Stephenson's crossing of the Chat Moss bog with the Liverpool and Manchester Railway. The canal was carried over the bog on a high embankment. Jessop also identified sources of water and built reservoirs, so that the canal was in no danger of running dry. Having seen to all of the important details Jessop returned to England, leaving a deputy in charge to complete the canal. This was finally done in 1805. It seems that Jessop was closely involved with the canal in Ireland until about 1787, after which time, other work flowed in.

== Relationship with other engineers ==
Jessop was a very modest man, who did not seek self-aggrandizement. Unlike other engineers, he was not jealous of rising young engineers, but rather encouraged them. He would also recommend another engineer if he was too busy to be able to undertake a commission himself. He recommended John Rennie for the post of engineer to the Lancaster Canal Company, an appointment that helped to establish Rennie's reputation. When Jessop was consulting engineer to the Ellesmere Canal Company, in 1793, the company appointed the relatively unknown Thomas Telford as resident engineer. Telford had no previous experience as a designer of canals, but with Jessop's advice and guidance, Telford made a success of the project. He supported Telford, even when the Company thought that the latter's designs for aqueducts were too ambitious.

== Cromford Canal ==
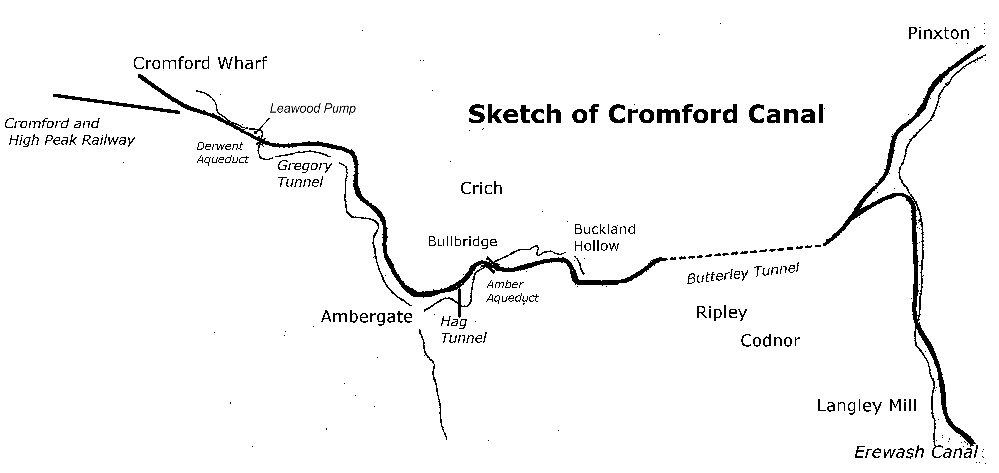
Sketch Map Showing Butterley Tunnel in Context with the Rest of the Cromford Canal

In 1789 Jessop was appointed chief engineer to the Cromford Canal Company. The proposed canal was intended to carry limestone, coal and iron ore from the Derwent and upper Erewash valleys and join the nearby Erewash Canal. The important features of this canal are the Derwent Viaduct, which was a single span viaduct carrying the canal over the River Derwent, and the Butterley Tunnel (formerly the Ripley Tunnel). In 1793, the Derwent Viaduct partially collapsed, and Jessop shouldered the blame, saying that he had not made the front walls strong enough. He had the viaduct repaired and strengthened at his own expense. The Butterley Tunnel was 2,966 yards (2,712 m) long, 9 ft (2.7 m) wide and 8 ft (2.4 m) high and required thirty-three shafts to be sunk from the surface to build it. Jessop built the Butterley Reservoir above the tunnel, extending for 50 acres (20 ha).

== Butterley Company ==
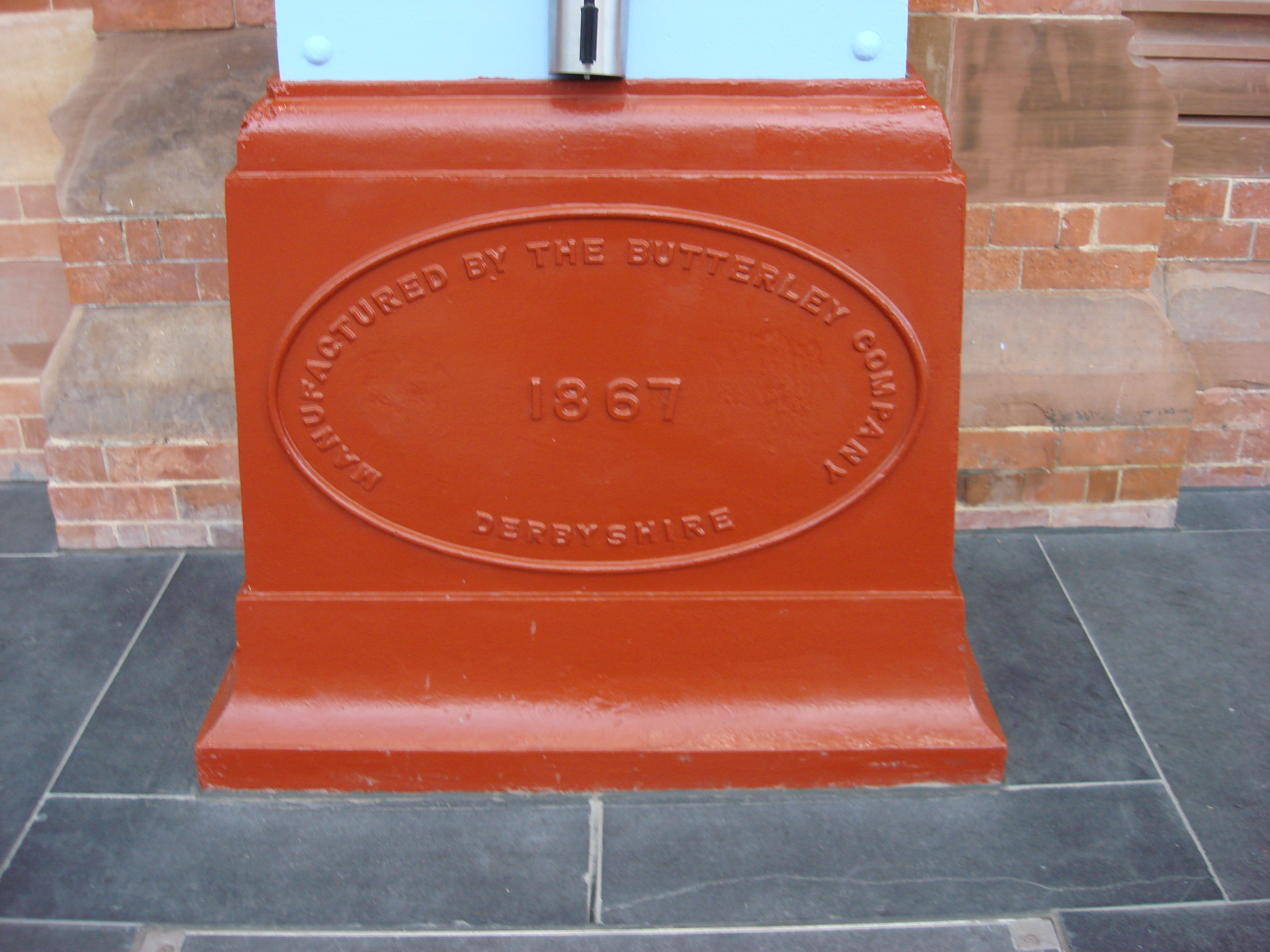
Butterley Company plate in St Pancras station

In 1790 Jessop founded, jointly with partners Benjamin Outram, Francis Beresford and John Wright, the Butterley Iron Works in Derbyshire to manufacture (amongst other things) cast-iron edge rails – a design Jessop had used successfully on a horse-drawn railway scheme for coal wagons between Nanpantan and Loughborough, Leicestershire (1789). Outram was concerned with the production of ironwork and equipment for Jessop's engineering projects.

== Grand Junction Canal ==
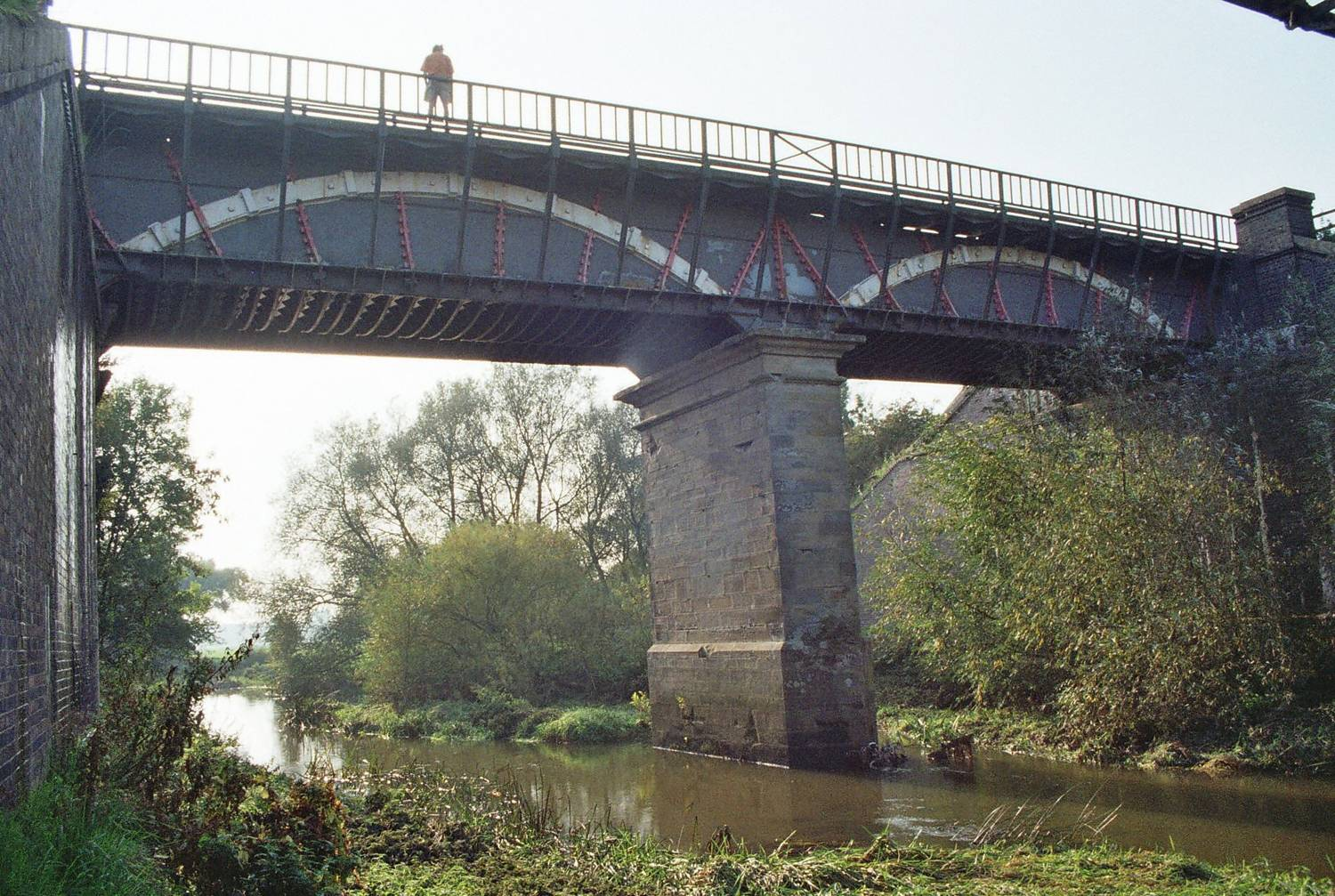
The Cosgrove aqueduct

The Oxford Canal had been built by James Brindley and carried coal to large parts of southern England. However, it did not provide a sufficiently direct route between the Midlands and London. As a result, a new canal was proposed to run from the Oxford Canal at Braunston, near Rugby, and to end at the Thames at Brentford, a length of ninety miles. Jessop was appointed Chief Engineer to the Canal Company in 1793. The canal was especially difficult to plan because, whereas other canals tended to follow river valleys and only crossed a watershed when unavoidable, the new canal had to cross the rivers Ouse, Nene and others. An aqueduct was built at Wolverton to carry the canal across the Ouse valley. Whilst the three-arch stone aqueduct was being built, a set of nine temporary locks were used to carry the canal down one side of the valley and up the other. The aqueduct failed in 1808, and was replaced by an iron one in 1811, the iron trough design sharing a similar structure to Longdon-on-Tern Aqueduct and the Pontcysyllte Aqueduct built by Thomas Telford. It is known as the Cosgrove aqueduct and was designed and built by Benjamin Bevan.

Two tunnels also had to be built, at Braunston and Blisworth. The Blisworth Tunnel caused great problems, and was unfinished when the rest of the canal was ready. In fact Jessop considered abandoning it and using locks to carry the canal over the ridge. Jessop's temporary solution was a railway line laid over the ridge to carry traffic until the tunnel was completed. The Grand Junction Canal was enormously important in encouraging trade between London and the Midlands.

== West India Docks ==
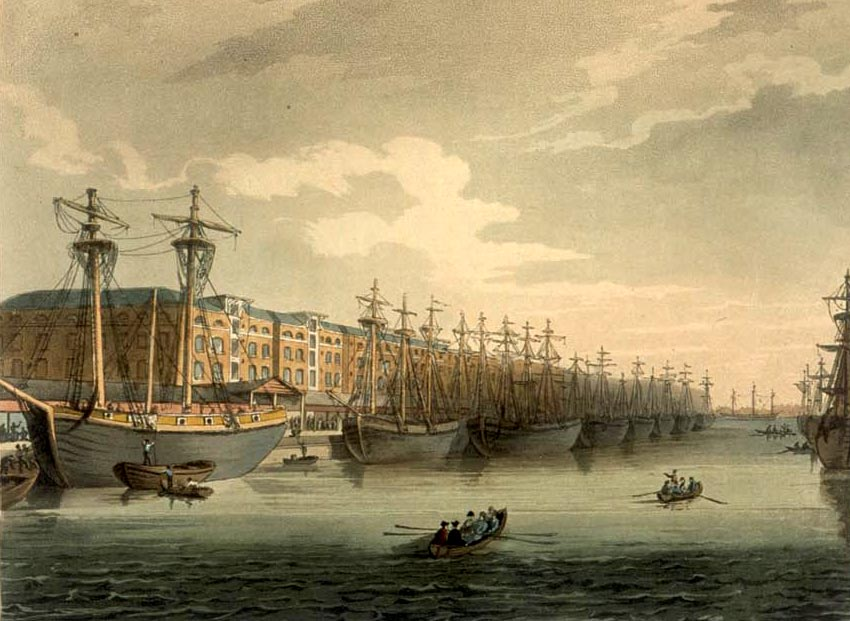
West India Docks by Augustus Pugin and Thomas Rowlandson (figures) from Rudolph Ackermann's Microcosm of London, or, London in Miniature (1808–11).

The West India Docks, built on the Isle of Dogs, was the first large wet docks built in the Port of London. Between 1800 and 1802 a wet dock area of 295 acres (1.19 km^{2}) was created with a depth of 24 ft (7.3 m), and accommodating 600 ships. Jessop was the chief engineer for the docks, with Ralph Walker as his assistant.

== Surrey Iron Railway ==
In 1799 separate proposals were put forward for a canal from London to Portsmouth and for a tramway carrying horse-drawn carriages over the same route. The first part of the proposed Surrey Iron Railway was to be from Wandsworth to Croydon, and Jessop was asked for his opinion on the two opposing schemes. He declared that the tramway was a better scheme, as a canal would require too much water and would unduly reduce the supply in the River Wandle. It was agreed to build a tramway from Wandsworth to Croydon, as well a building a basin at Wandsworth. Jessop was appointed Chief Engineer of the project in 1801. In 1802 the Wandsworth Basin and the line were completed. There seems to be doubt as to the gauge of the line with some estimates stating 4 ft 2 in (1.27 m) and others stating 4 ft 8½ in.

In 1803, the next phase was authorized for a line from Croydon via Merstham to Godstone in Surrey. Jessop was again appointed chief engineer, with his son Josias as his assistant. The line reached Merstham but was never continued to Godstone. The total distance of the tramway from Wandsworth was 18 miles (29 km). The tramway was eventually overtaken by the advent of steam locomotives.

== Later life ==
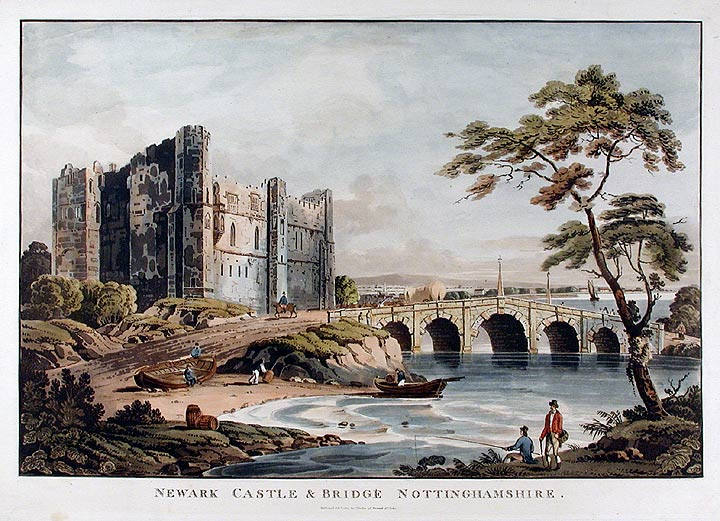
Newark Castle and Bridge in the early 19th century.

From 1784 to 1805 Jessop lived in Newark in Nottinghamshire, where he twice served as town mayor.

In his later life, Jessop became increasingly inflicted by a form of paralysis, and 1805 marked the end of his active career. He died at his home, Butterley Hall, on 18 November 1814. His son Josias became a successful engineer in his own right.

== Legacy ==
Jessop was in the unusual position of bridging the gap between the canal engineers and the railway engineers who came later. His name did not gain the lasting fame that it deserved because of his modesty. Indeed, some of his works have been wrongly attributed to engineers who acted as his assistants. Unlike some engineers, such as George Stephenson, Jessop did not stoop to undignified wrangles with fellow professionals. He was highly regarded by almost all those who had worked with him or for him.

== List of Jessop's engineering projects ==
- the Aire and Calder Navigation
- the Calder and Hebble Navigation (1758–1770)
- the Caledonian Canal
- the Ripon Canal (1767)
- the Chester Canal (May 1778) as a contractor with James Pinkerton
- the Leicester Navigation (1791–1794)
- the Barnsley Canal (1792–1802)
- the Grand Canal of Ireland between the River Shannon and Dublin (1773–1805)
- the Grand Junction Canal (1793–1805), later part of the Grand Union Canal
- the Cromford Canal, Derbyshire/Nottinghamshire
- the Nottingham Canal (1792–1796)
- the River Trent Navigation
- the Grantham Canal (1793–1797), the first English canal entirely dependent on reservoirs for its water supply
- Engineer of the Ellesmere Canal (1793–1805), detailed design undertaken by Thomas Telford)
- the Rochdale Canal (1794–1798)
- the Sleaford Navigation (1794)
- the West India Docks and Isle of Dogs canal, London (1800–1802); John Rennie was a consultant on the Docks project
- the Surrey Iron Railway, linking Wandsworth and Croydon (1801–1802), arguably the world's first public railway—albeit horse-drawn
- the 'Floating Harbour' in Bristol (1804–1809)
- the Kilmarnock and Troon Railway (1807–1812; the first railway in Scotland authorised by Act of Parliament)
- harbours at Shoreham-by-Sea and Littlehampton, West Sussex

== See also ==
- Canals of the United Kingdom
- History of the British canal system
