= Hesperorhipis jacumbae =

Scientific classification
- Domain: Eukaryota
- Kingdom: Animalia
- Phylum: Arthropoda
- Class: Insecta
- Order: Coleoptera
- Suborder: Polyphaga
- Infraorder: Elateriformia
- Family: Buprestidae
- Genus: Hesperorhipis
- Species: H. jacumbae

Binomial name
- Hesperorhipis jacumbae Knull, 1954

Species of beetle

Hesperorhipis jacumbae is a species of metallic wood-boring beetle in the family Buprestidae. It is found in North America.
