= Hyperbolic =

Hyperbolic may refer to:

- of or pertaining to a hyperbola, a type of smooth curve lying in a plane in mathematics
  - Hyperbolic geometry, a non-Euclidean geometry
  - Hyperbolic functions, analogues of ordinary trigonometric functions, defined using the hyperbola
- of or pertaining to hyperbole, the use of exaggeration as a rhetorical device or figure of speech
- Hyperbolic (album), by Pnau, 2024

== See also ==
- Exaggeration
- Hyperbola (disambiguation)
- Hyperboloid
