= Trichinorhipis =

Conservation status
- Critically Imperiled (NatureServe)

Scientific classification
- Kingdom: Animalia
- Phylum: Arthropoda
- Class: Insecta
- Order: Coleoptera
- Suborder: Polyphaga
- Infraorder: Elateriformia
- Family: Buprestidae
- Subfamily: Buprestinae
- Tribe: Xenorhipidini
- Genus: Trichinorhipis; Barr, 1948
- Species: T. knulli

Binomial name
- Trichinorhipis knulli Barr, 1948

Genus of beetles

Trichinorhipis is a monotypic genus of beetles in the family Buprestidae, subfamily Buprestinae, and tribe Xenorhipidini. The single species, Trichinorhipis knulli, is endemic to California in the United States, where it has been collected from Riverside and Imperial Counties.

This beetle is black with large whitish marks across its elytra. The original specimen measured less than 4 millimeters in length. It has fan-like (flabellate) antennae. Very few specimens of this beetle have been collected, but it has usually been associated with jojoba (Simmondsia chinensis).

The beetle has been collected close to the Mexico–United States border, so it likely occurs in Mexico as well.

The genus is so far monotypic, another undescribed beetle found in West Texas likely belongs to the genus as well.
