= Bevan point =

Triangle center: circumcenter of a triangle's excentral triangle

Reference triangle △ABC Excentral triangle △M_{A}M_{B}M_{C} of △ABC Circumcircle of △M_{A}M_{B}M_{C} (Bevan circle of △ABC, centered at Bevan point M)

Reference triangle △ABC Excentral triangle △M_{A}M_{B}M_{C} of △ABC Bevan circle k_{M} of △ABC (centered at Bevan point M) Euler line e, on which circumcenter O, orthocenter H, centroid G, and de Longchamps point L lie Other points: incenter I, Nagel point N

In geometry, the Bevan point, named after Benjamin Bevan, is a triangle center. It is defined as center of the Bevan circle, that is the circle through the centers of the three excircles of a triangle.

The Bevan point of a triangle is the reflection of the incenter across the circumcenter of the triangle. Bevan posed the problem of proving this in 1804, in a mathematical problem column in The Mathematical Repository. The problem was solved in 1806 by John Butterworth.

The Bevan point M of triangle △ABC has the same distance from its Euler line e as its incenter I. Their distance is
$$\overline{MI} = 2\sqrt{R^2-\frac{abc}{a+b+c}}$$
where R denotes the radius of the circumcircle and a, b, c the sides of △ABC.

The Bevan point is also the midpoint of the line segment N̅L̅ connecting the Nagel point N and the de Longchamps point L. The radius of the Bevan circle is 2R, that is twice the radius of the circumcircle.
