= Hesperorhipis mirabilis =

Scientific classification
- Domain: Eukaryota
- Kingdom: Animalia
- Phylum: Arthropoda
- Class: Insecta
- Order: Coleoptera
- Suborder: Polyphaga
- Infraorder: Elateriformia
- Family: Buprestidae
- Genus: Hesperorhipis
- Species: H. mirabilis

Binomial name
- Hesperorhipis mirabilis Knull, 1937

Species of beetle

Hesperorhipis mirabilis is a species of metallic wood-boring beetle in the family Buprestidae. It is found in North America.

== Subspecies ==
These two subspecies belong to the species Hesperorhipis mirabilis:

- Hesperorhipis mirabilis albopennis Knull, 1951
- Hesperorhipis mirabilis mirabilis Knull, 1937
