= Cosgrove Hall, Northamptonshire =

Historic house in Northamptonshire, England

Coordinates: 52.0735°N 0.8471°W

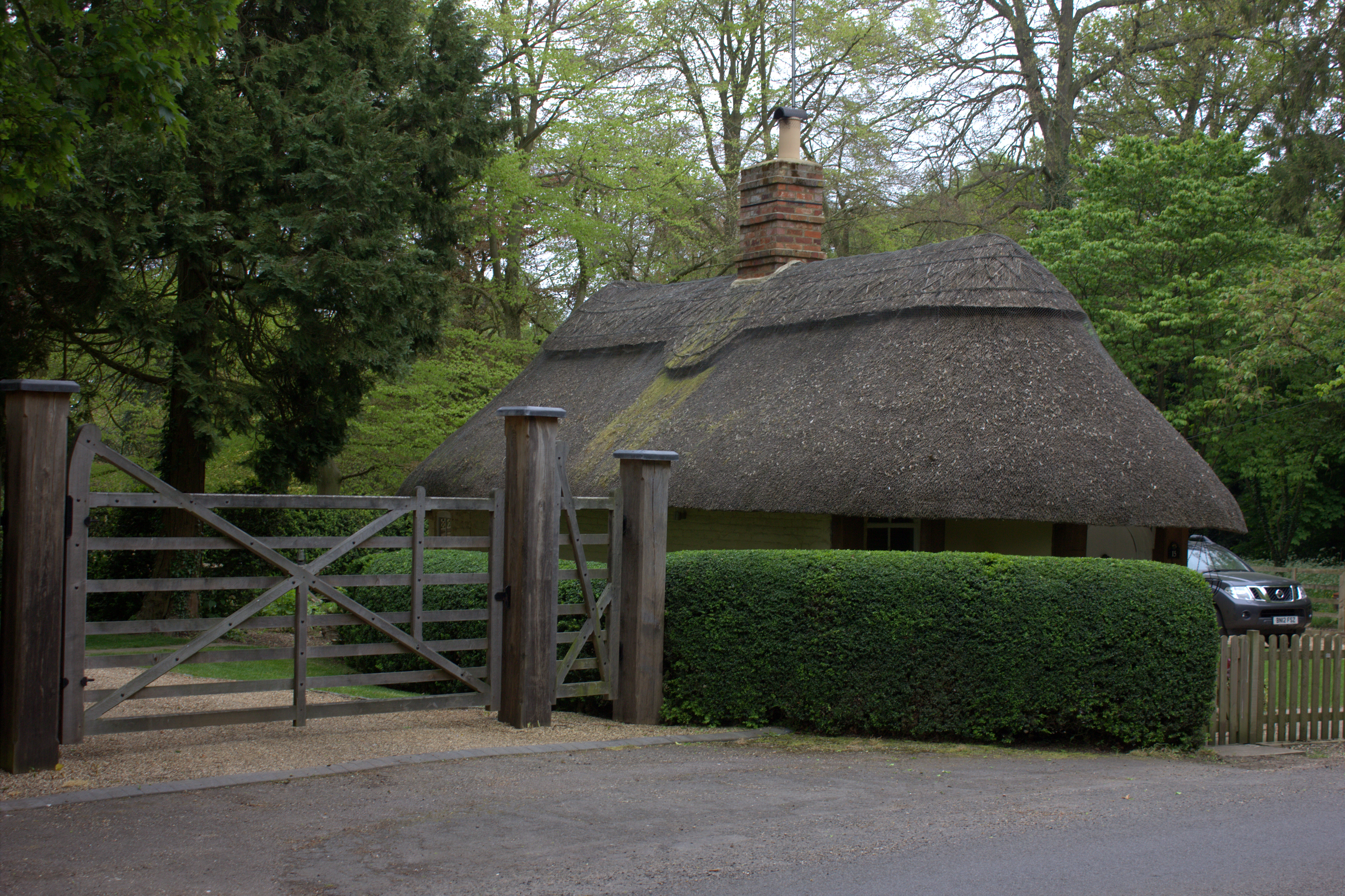
Entrance gate to the hall

Cosgrove Hall is an early-18th-century Grade II listed country house in Cosgrove, Northamptonshire. It was built on the site of an earlier house by the Furtho family. It is not open to the public. It may have been built by John Lumley of Northampton. In the nineteenth century, the building belonged to John Christopher Mansel. In May 1945, Queen Geraldine of Albania, the Queen consort to King Zog I of Albania, opened a fête at the hall. The building was destroyed by fire in October 2016.

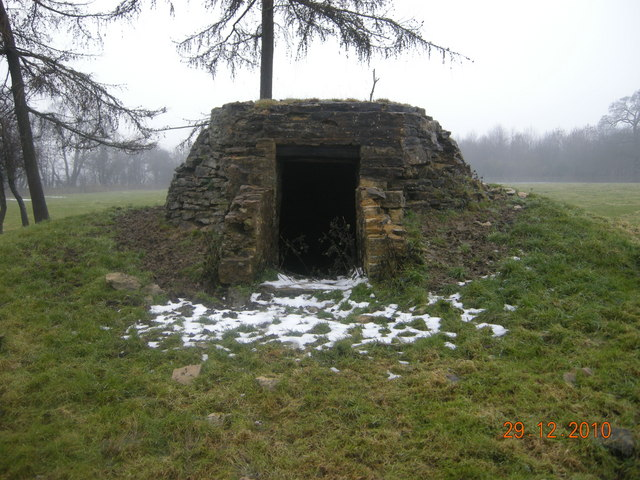
The ice house at Cosgrove Hall in December 2010.

As well as the hall the other Grade II buildings on the estate are the dovecote, the stable block and the ice house. In front of the house, there is an excavated Roman bath house, viewable from the Grand Union Canal.
