= Cosgrove, Northamptonshire =

Village in Northamptonshire, England

Coordinates: 52.076°N 0.847°W

Cosgrove
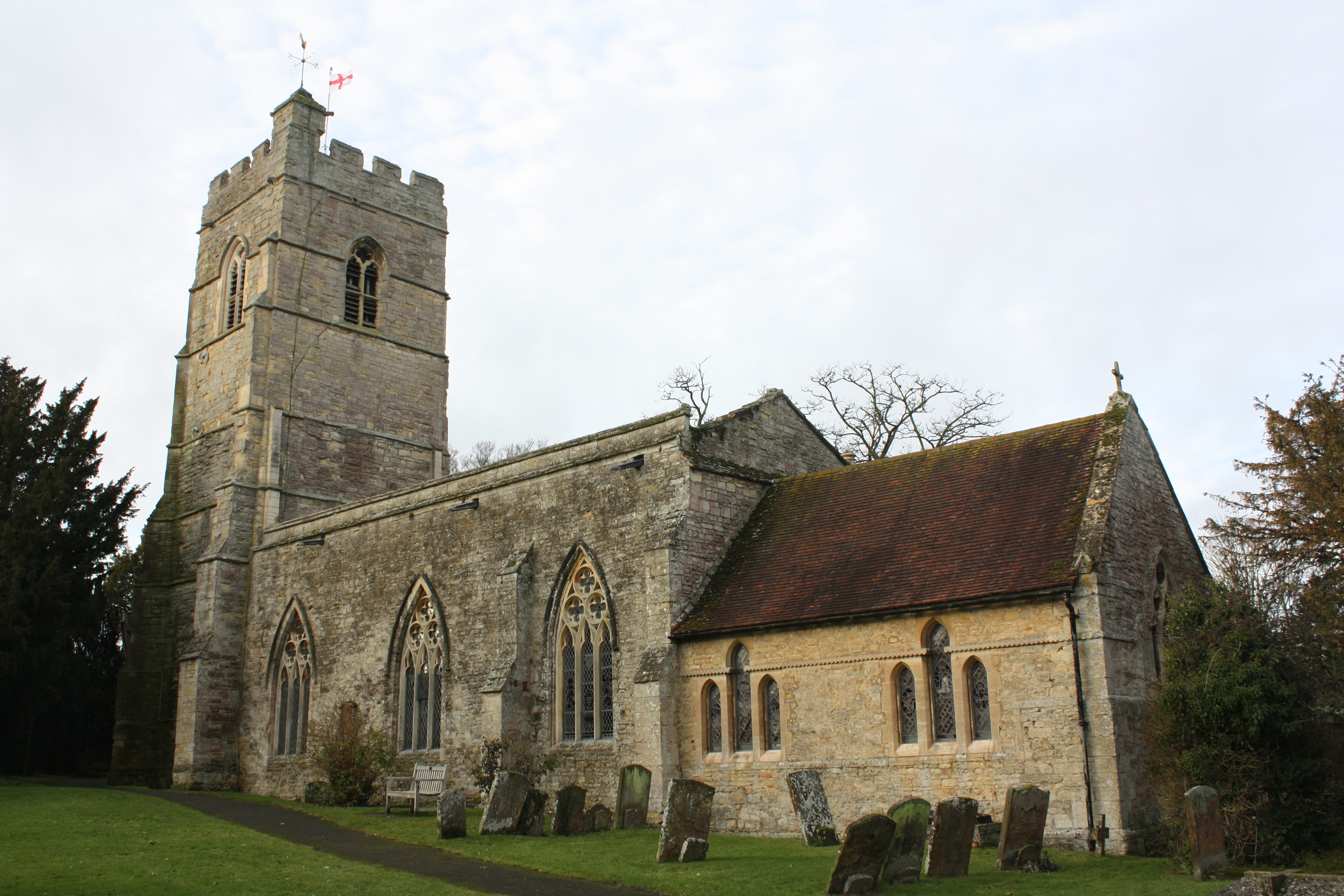
- Church of SS Peter and Paul, Cosgrove

- Location within Northamptonshire
- Interactive map of Cosgrove
- Population: 480 (2001 census); 521 (2011 Census)
- OS grid reference: SP790426
  - London: 62 miles (100 km)
- Unitary authority: West Northamptonshire
- Ceremonial county: Northamptonshire
- Region: East Midlands
- Country: England
- Sovereign state: United Kingdom
- Post town: MILTON KEYNES
- Postcode district: MK19
- Dialling code: 01908
- Police: Northamptonshire
- Fire: Northamptonshire
- Ambulance: East Midlands
- UK Parliament: Daventry

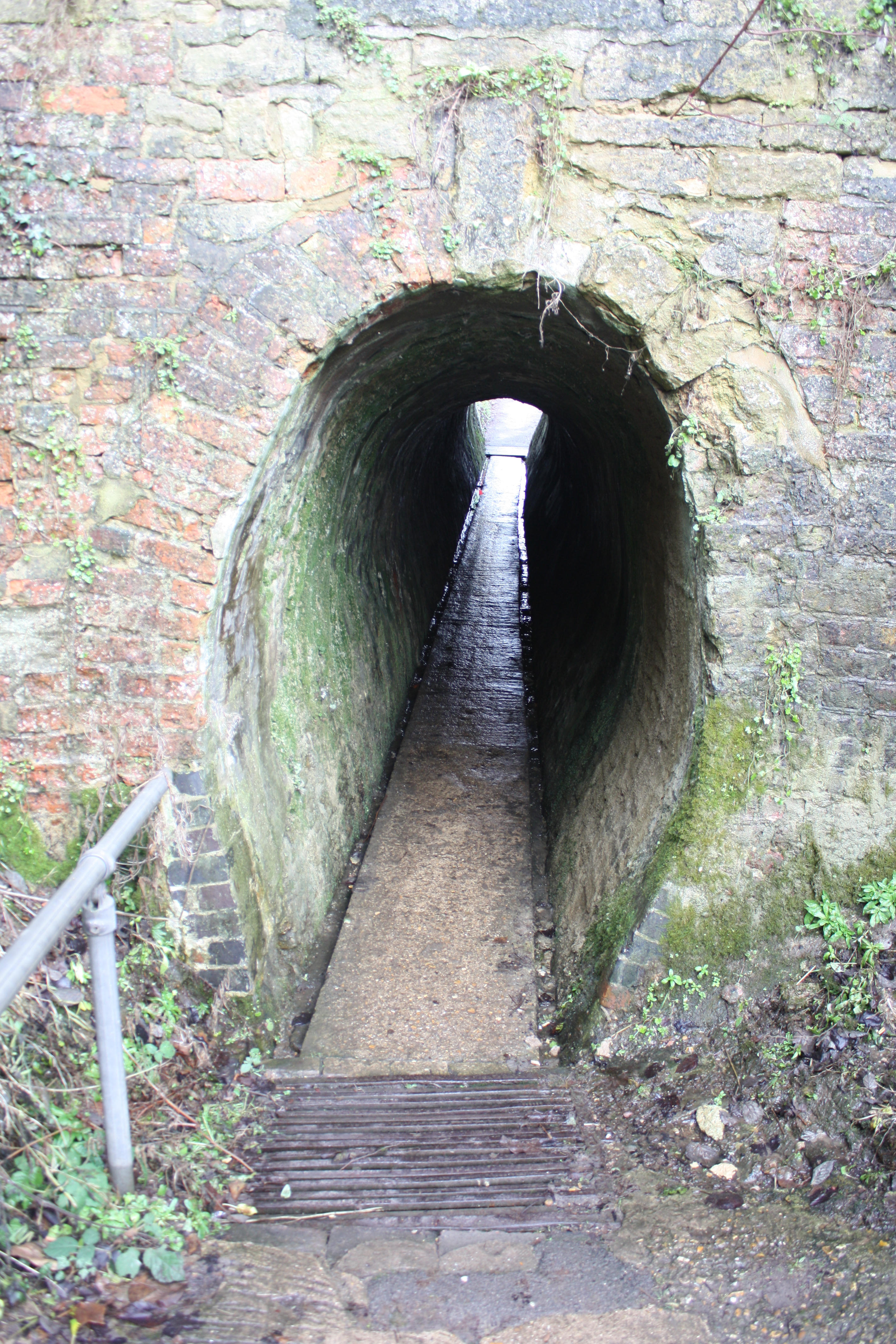
Horse tunnel under the Grand Union Canal at Cosgrove

Cosgrove is a village in West Northamptonshire, England, about 2 miles (3 km) north of Stony Stratford, 6 miles (10 km) north of Central Milton Keynes and 12 miles (19 km) south of Northampton along the A508 road and 8 miles (13 km) south-east of Towcester along the A5 road (the Roman road Watling Street). The River Tove passes to the east of the village, flowing into the River Great Ouse just to the south. The Grand Union Canal passes through the middle of the village

The villages name means 'Cof's grove' or perhaps, less likely, 'Cof's pit/trench'.

== Grand Union Canal ==
Immediately south-east of the village the canal crosses the valley of the river Great Ouse on an embankment and aqueduct known as the Cosgrove Iron Trunk Aqueduct. The river was initially crossed on the level, with four temporary locks lowering the canal from the south-east, and five raising it from the river towards the north-west (the top lock of these is still in place). The temporary locks were used as a means of getting the canal open to through traffic by 1800 (this river crossing and the tunnel at Blisworth being the only two gaps by that year). However, it was always intended that the river should be crossed by aqueduct, as the locks were wasteful of water, time-consuming and the river in flood in winter could prevent through passage. A brick aqueduct was built, but collapsed in 1808, after which the locks were re-opened. It was replaced by the present Cosgrove aqueduct, built of cast iron, and opened on 22 January 1811. The old lock gates can still be seen beside the footpath below the canal embankment.

The 10.5 miles (17 km) Buckingham branch of the canal (also known as the Buckingham Arm), an extension of the original proposal for a link to the main road at Old Stratford, was opened in 1801, diverging from the main line just to the south-east of the village, above the lock. It closed in the 1960s but there is a desire to re-open the now dry and defunct canal arm. The Buckingham Canal Society was formed to reopen the original canal line wherever possible.

This Buckingham branch froze more quickly and solidly than either the River Ouse or the main canal. This was noticed not only by skaters from miles around, but also by the owner of Cosgrove Hall, who in about 1820 built an ice-house half-way between the canal and the Hall. The ice house was constructed rather like a stone windmill, with very thick walls but, unlike the windmill, the ice house has its greater part below the level of the surrounding field. Into the ice house, every winter from 1820 until the 1900s, ice cut from the canal would be stored and packed around with straw. By this method it kept until the following spring and summer, when it would be sold to local fishmongers, butchers and others in the days before refrigeration. In recent years it has become derelict, but it was the last remaining in Buckinghamshire and one of the very few left in England.

For the past 200 years life in the village has been affected by the presence of the canal. For a while the village was a very busy trading centre, with iron tracks at the canal wharf still evident, but as traffic moved to the railway (now the West Coast Main Line) and roads improved, life and business in the village slowed down again. However, modern use of the canal and its towpath for leisure and tourism has brought new vigour.

The Victorian Gothic-style Ornamental Bridge - called Solomon's Bridge - over the canal was built in 1790s at the insistence of a local landowner, the Biggins family, when the two halves of the canal joined here, one from Braunston, the other from Brentford. It is one of only two ornamental bridges over the canal.

== Historic buildings and other features ==
The Parish Church is dedicated to St Peter and St Paul and parts date from the 13th century but is described by Pevsner as: badly over-restored...the result of E F Law trying to regothicize what had been made plain Georgian in 1770-4. There is a memorial to Pulter Forester (d.1778). The tower is over 70 feet tall and contains six bells with one 'Santa Maria' dating to the 15th century.

Cosgrove Hall and its estate was built in the early 18th century on the site of an earlier house by the Furtho family. It is not open to the public. It may have been built by John Lumley of Northampton. The building was badly damaged by fire in October 2016.

The Priory was built in the 17th century by the Rigby family and is now privately owned. Originally known as the Manor House, the name was changed to The Priory in around 1810. Pevsner states that it has a Rood Screen from the time of Henry VIII.

St. Vincent's Well, enclosed by iron railings behind the old National School in the High Street, is said to have a high iron content; this, some believe, gives remedial qualities to the water.

South-east of Cosgrove Hall and the church on the south bank of the canal is the site of a Roman Villa, bath house and temple discovered in 1957 and excavated in the 1950s and 60s. Many finds including an urn of silver coins were found during construction of the canal. This is about 1 mile from the Roman Road known as Watling Street.

There was once a corn mill on the River Tove, dating from 1086, which Robert Maudit granted to Roger the miller of Cosgrove and his son Robert for life in 1211. The mill remained in use until the early 20th century when it fell into disrepair and was demolished in 1979.

South west of the village are The Quarries, the remains of a medieval limestone quarry, now calcareous grassland, with a rich plant community of limestone-loving plants such as the spotted cat's ear and fragrant orchid. The site is also home to rare insects such as the ground beetle and birds such as the skylark and barn owl.

Cosgrove Leisure Park, a caravan site, attracts many visitors, caravanners and holiday-makers. The park surrounds an area of flooded gravel pits beside the Tove and Great Ouse, south of the village. It has a swimming and paddling pool, fishing lakes and a water sports area. There are pitches for 500 touring caravans and 460 owner-occupied static holiday homes.

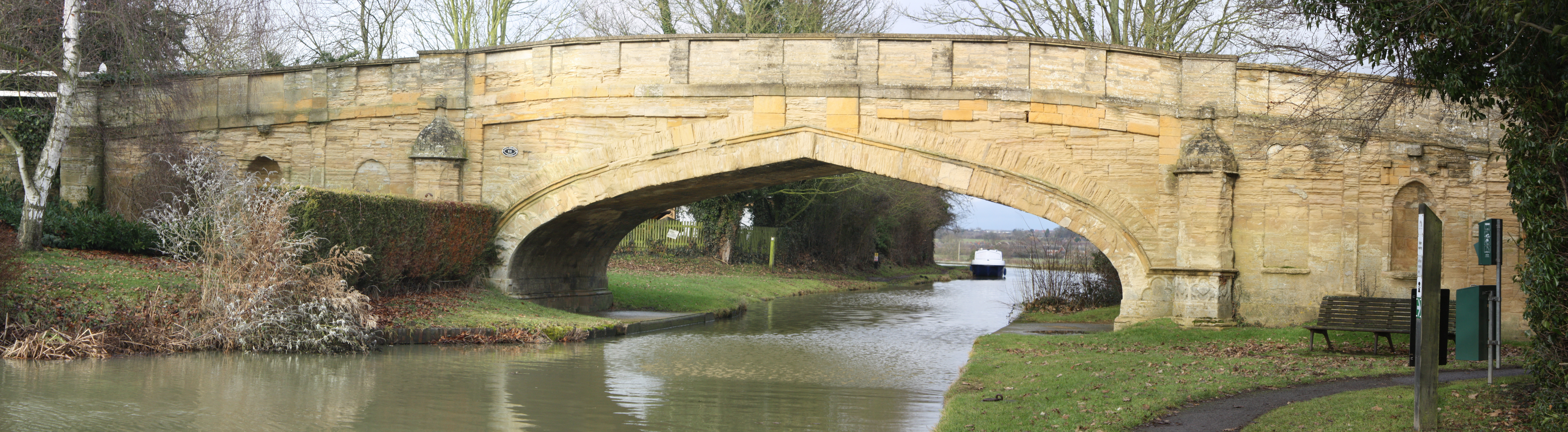
Ornamental bridge built ca. 1790 over the Grand Union Canal at Cosgrove
