= Morley centers =

Triangle centers found by trisecting each vertex

In plane geometry, the Morley centers are two special points associated with a triangle. Both of them are triangle centers. One of them called first Morley center (or simply, the Morley center ) is designated as X(356) in Clark Kimberling's Encyclopedia of Triangle Centers, while the other point called second Morley center (or the 1st Morley–Taylor–Marr Center) is designated as X(357). The two points are also related to Morley's trisector theorem which was discovered by Frank Morley in around 1899.

== Definitions ==
Let △DEF be the triangle formed by the intersections of the adjacent angle trisectors of triangle △ABC. △DEF is called the Morley triangle of △ABC. Morley's trisector theorem states that the Morley triangle of any triangle is always an equilateral triangle.

=== First Morley center ===
Let △DEF be the Morley triangle of △ABC. The centroid of △DEF is called the first Morley center of △ABC.

=== Second Morley center ===
Let △DEF be the Morley triangle of △ABC. Then, the lines AD, BE, CF are concurrent. The point of concurrence is called the second Morley center of triangle △ABC.

== Trilinear coordinates ==
=== First Morley center ===
The trilinear coordinates of the first Morley center of triangle △ABC are $\cos \tfrac{A}{3} + 2 \cos \tfrac{B}{3} \cos \tfrac{C}{3} : \cos \tfrac{B}{3} + 2 \cos \tfrac{C}{3} \cos \tfrac{A}{3} : \cos \tfrac{C}{3} + 2 \cos \tfrac{A}{3} \cos \tfrac{B}{3}$

=== Second Morley center ===
The trilinear coordinates of the second Morley center are

$\sec \tfrac{A}{3} : \sec \tfrac{B}{3} : \sec \tfrac{C}{3}$
