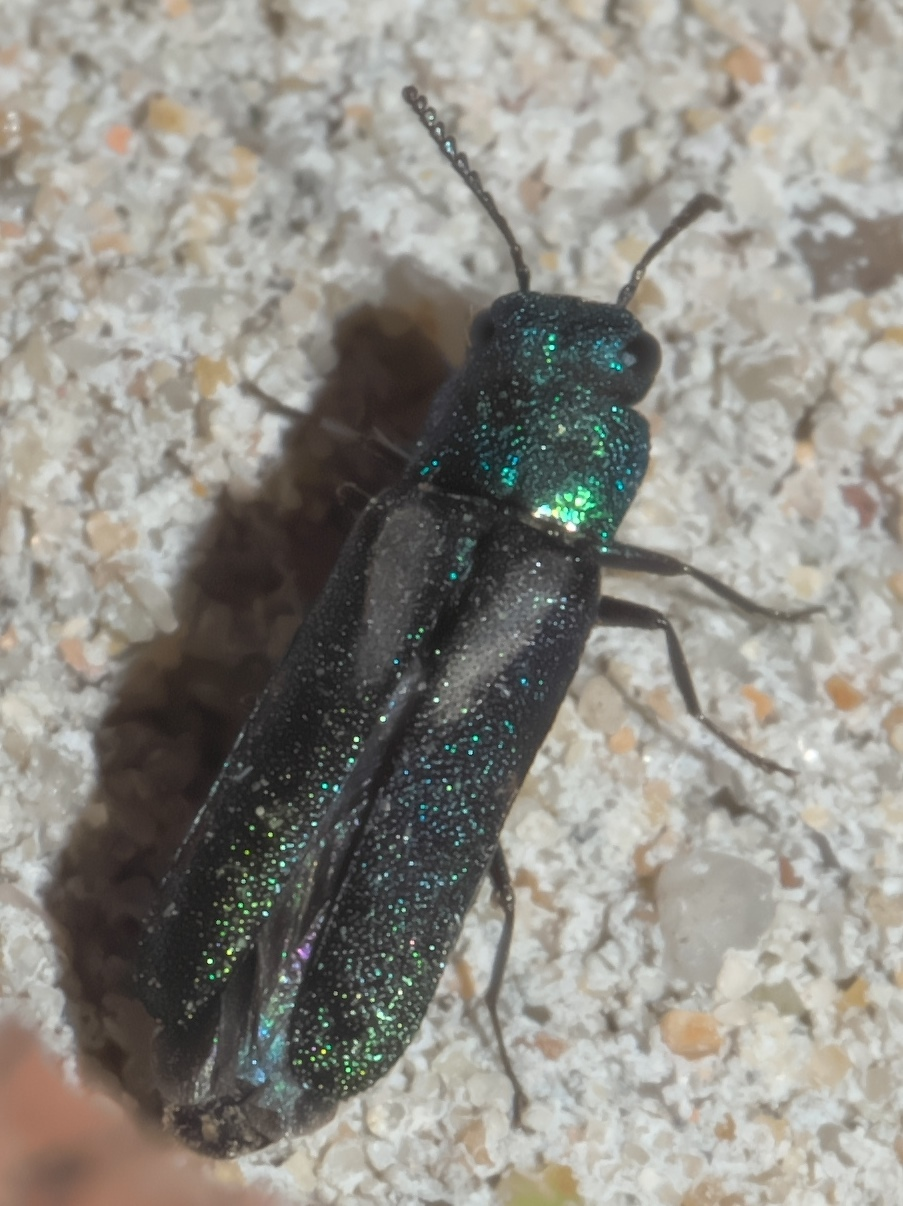
- Xenorhipis brendeli, Oklahoma

Scientific classification
- Domain: Eukaryota
- Kingdom: Animalia
- Phylum: Arthropoda
- Class: Insecta
- Order: Coleoptera
- Suborder: Polyphaga
- Infraorder: Elateriformia
- Family: Buprestidae
- Genus: Xenorhipis
- Species: X. brendeli

Binomial name
- Xenorhipis brendeli LeConte, 1866

Synonyms
- Xenorhipis vejdovskyi Obenberger, 1939

= Xenorhipis brendeli =

Species of beetle

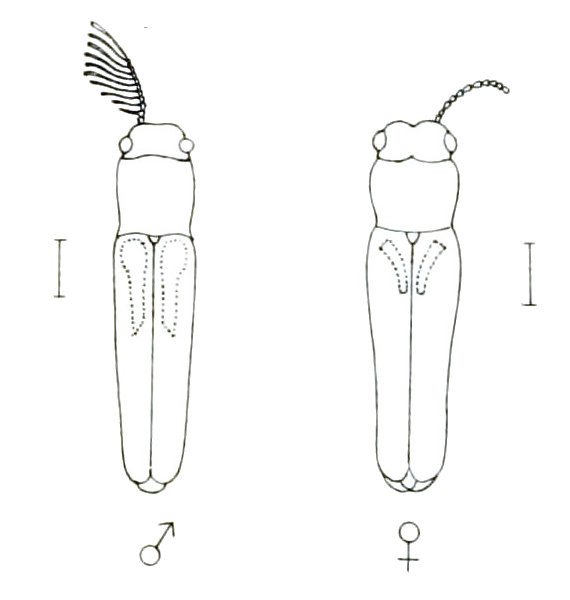

Xenorhipis brendeli is a species of metallic wood-boring beetle in the family Buprestidae. It is found in North America.
