= Equal detour point =

Triangle center

Triangle △ABC (side lengths a, b, c) Incircle (centered at incenter I) Isoperimetric lines d_{A}, d_{B}, d_{C} (concur at isoperimetric point Q) Detours h_{A}, h_{B}, h_{C} (concur at equal detour point P): $$\begin{align} & h_A + h_C - b \\ ={}& h_A + h_B - c \\ ={}& h_B + h_C - a \end{align}$$ I, Q, P and the Gergonne point G are collinear and form a harmonic range: $\frac{\overline{QI}}{\overline{PI}} = \frac{\overline{QG}}{\overline{PG}}$

In Euclidean geometry, the equal detour point is a triangle center denoted by X(176) in Clark Kimberling's Encyclopedia of Triangle Centers. It is characterized by the equal detour property: if one travels from any vertex of a triangle △ABC to another by taking a detour through some inner point P, then the additional distance traveled is constant. This means the following equation has to hold:

$$\begin{align}
& \overline{AP} + \overline{PC} - \overline{AC} \\[3mu]
={}& \overline{AP} + \overline{PB} - \overline{AB} \\[3mu]
={}& \overline{BP} + \overline{PC} - \overline{BC}.
\end{align}$$

The equal detour point is the only point with the equal detour property if and only if the following inequality holds for the angles α, β, γ of △ABC:

$$\tan\tfrac12\alpha + \tan\tfrac12\beta + \tan \tfrac12\gamma \leq 2$$

If the inequality does not hold, then the isoperimetric point possesses the equal detour property as well.

The equal detour point, isoperimetric point, the incenter and the Gergonne point of a triangle are collinear, that is all four points lie on a common line. Furthermore, they form a harmonic range (see graphic on the right).

The equal detour point is the center of the inner Soddy circle of a triangle and the additional distance travelled by the detour is equal to the diameter of the inner Soddy Circle.

The barycentric coordinates of the equal detour point are

$$\left( a+\frac{\Delta}{s-a} : b+\frac{\Delta}{s-b} : c+\frac{\Delta}{s-c} \right).$$

and the trilinear coordinates are: $1 + \frac{\cos\tfrac12\beta\,\cos\tfrac12\gamma}{\cos\tfrac12\alpha} \ :\ 1 + \frac{\cos\tfrac12\gamma\,\cos\tfrac12\alpha}{\cos\tfrac12\beta} \ :\ 1 + \frac{\cos\tfrac12\alpha\,\cos\tfrac12\beta}{\cos\tfrac12\gamma}$
