= Xenorhipis osborni =

Scientific classification
- Domain: Eukaryota
- Kingdom: Animalia
- Phylum: Arthropoda
- Class: Insecta
- Order: Coleoptera
- Suborder: Polyphaga
- Infraorder: Elateriformia
- Family: Buprestidae
- Genus: Xenorhipis
- Species: X. osborni

Binomial name
- Xenorhipis osborni Knull, 1936

Species of beetle

Xenorhipis osborni is a species of metallic wood-boring beetle in the family Buprestidae. It is found in North America.
