= Hofstadter points =

Triangle center

In plane geometry, a Hofstadter point is a special point associated with every plane triangle. In fact there are several Hofstadter points associated with a triangle. All of them are triangle centers. Two of them, the Hofstadter zero-point and Hofstadter one-point, are particularly interesting. They are two transcendental triangle centers. Hofstadter zero-point is the center designated as X(360) and the Hofstadter one-point is the center denoted as X(359) in Clark Kimberling's Encyclopedia of Triangle Centers. The Hofstadter zero-point was discovered by Douglas Hofstadter in 1992.

== Hofstadter triangles ==

Let △ABC be a given triangle. Let r be a positive real constant.

Rotate the line segment B̅C̅ about B through an angle rB towards A and let L_{BC} be the line containing this line segment. Next rotate the line segment B̅C̅ about C through an angle rC towards A. Let L'_{BC} be the line containing this line segment. Let the lines L_{BC} and L'_{BC} intersect at A(r). In a similar way the points B(r) and C(r) are constructed. The triangle whose vertices are A(r), B(r), C(r) is the Hofstadter r-triangle (or, the r-Hofstadter triangle) of △ABC.

=== Special case ===
- The Hofstadter 1/3-triangle of triangle △ABC is the first Morley's triangle of △ABC. Morley's triangle is always an equilateral triangle.
- The Hofstadter 1/2-triangle is simply the incentre of the triangle.

=== Trilinear coordinates of the vertices of Hofstadter triangles ===
The trilinear coordinates of the vertices of the Hofstadter r-triangle are given below:

$$\begin{array}{ccccccc}
A(r) &=& 1 &:& \frac{\sin rB}{\sin (1-r)B} &:& \frac{\sin rC}{\sin(1-r)C} \\[2pt]
B(r) &=&  \frac{\sin rA}{\sin(1-r)A} &:& 1 &:& \frac{\sin rC}{\sin(1-r)C} \\[2pt]
C(r) &=&  \frac{\sin rA}{\sin(1-r)A} &:& \frac{\sin(1-r)B}{\sin rB} &:& 1
\end{array}$$

== Hofstadter points ==
Animation showing various Hofstadter points. H_{0} is the Hofstadter zero-point. H_{1} is the Hofstadter one-point. The little red arc in the center of the triangle is the locus of the Hofstadter r-points for 0 < r < 1. This locus passes through the incenter I of the triangle.

For a positive real constant r > 0, let A(r), B(r), C(r) be the Hofstadter r-triangle of triangle △ABC. Then the lines AA(r), BB(r), CC(r) are concurrent. The point of concurrence is the Hofstdter r-point of △ABC.

=== Trilinear coordinates of Hofstadter r-point ===
The trilinear coordinates of the Hofstadter r-point are given below.

$$\frac{\sin rA}{\sin(A-rA)} \ :\ \frac{\sin rB}{\sin(B-rB)} \ :\ \frac{\sin rC}{\sin(C-rC)}$$

== Hofstadter zero- and one-points ==
The trilinear coordinates of these points cannot be obtained by plugging in the values 0 and 1 for r in the expressions for the trilinear coordinates for the Hofstadter r-point.

The Hofstadter zero-point is the limit of the Hofstadter r-point as r approaches zero; thus, the trilinear coordinates of Hofstadter zero-point are derived as follows:

$$\begin{array}{rccccc}
\displaystyle \lim_{r \to 0} & \frac{\sin rA}{\sin(A-rA)} &:& \frac{\sin rB}{\sin(B-rB)} &:& \frac{\sin rC}{\sin(C-rC)} \\[4pt]
\implies \displaystyle \lim_{r \to 0} & \frac{\sin rA}{r\sin(A-rA)} &:& \frac{\sin rB}{r\sin(B-rB)} &:& \frac{\sin rC}{r\sin(C-rC)} \\[4pt]
\implies \displaystyle \lim_{r \to 0} & \frac{A\sin rA}{rA\sin(A-rA)} &:& \frac{B\sin rB}{rB\sin(B-rB)} &:& \frac{C\sin rC}{rC\sin(C-rC)}
\end{array}$$

Since $\lim_{r \to 0} \tfrac{\sin rA}{rA} = \lim_{r \to 0} \tfrac{\sin rB}{rB} = \lim_{r \to 0} \tfrac{\sin rC}{rC} = 1,$

$$\implies \frac{A}{\sin A}\ :\ \frac{B}{\sin B}\ :\ \frac{C}{\sin C} \quad = \quad \frac{A}{a}\ :\ \frac{B}{b}\ :\ \frac{C}{c}$$

The Hofstadter one-point is the limit of the Hofstadter r-point as r approaches one; thus, the trilinear coordinates of the Hofstadter one-point are derived as follows:

$$\begin{array}{rccccc}
\displaystyle \lim_{r \to 1} & \frac{\sin rA}{\sin(A-rA)} &:& \frac{\sin rB}{\sin(B-rB)} &:& \frac{\sin rC}{\sin(C-rC)} \\[4pt]
\implies \displaystyle \lim_{r \to 1} & \frac{(1-r)\sin rA}{\sin(A-rA)} &:& \frac{(1-r)\sin rB}{\sin(B-rB)} &:& \frac{(1-r)\sin rC}{\sin(C-rC)} \\[4pt]
\implies \displaystyle \lim_{r \to 1} & \frac{(1-r)A\sin rA}{A\sin(A-rA)} &:& \frac{(1-r)B\sin rB}{B\sin(B-rB)} &:& \frac{(1-r)C\sin rC}{C\sin(C-rC)}
\end{array}$$

Since $\lim_{r \to 1} \tfrac{(1-r)A}{\sin(A-rA)} = \lim_{r \to 1} \tfrac{(1-r)B}{\sin(B-rB)} = \lim_{r \to 1} \tfrac{(1-r)C}{\sin(C-rC)} = 1,$

$$\implies \frac{\sin A}{A}\ :\ \frac{\sin B}{B}\ :\ \frac{\sin C}{C} \quad = \quad \frac{a}{A}\ :\ \frac{b}{B}\ :\ \frac{c}{C}$$
