= Hesperorhipis albofasciata =

Scientific classification
- Domain: Eukaryota
- Kingdom: Animalia
- Phylum: Arthropoda
- Class: Insecta
- Order: Coleoptera
- Suborder: Polyphaga
- Infraorder: Elateriformia
- Family: Buprestidae
- Genus: Hesperorhipis
- Species: H. albofasciata

Binomial name
- Hesperorhipis albofasciata Fall, 1930

Species of beetle

Hesperorhipis albofasciata is a species of metallic wood-boring beetle in the family Buprestidae. It is found in North America.
