= Mixtilinear incircles of a triangle =

Circle tangent to two sides of a triangle and its circumcircle

In plane geometry, a mixtilinear incircle of a triangle is a circle which is tangent to two of its sides and internally tangent to its circumcircle. The mixtilinear incircle of a triangle tangent to the two sides containing vertex $A$ is called the $A$-mixtilinear incircle. Every triangle has three unique mixtilinear incircles, one corresponding to each vertex.

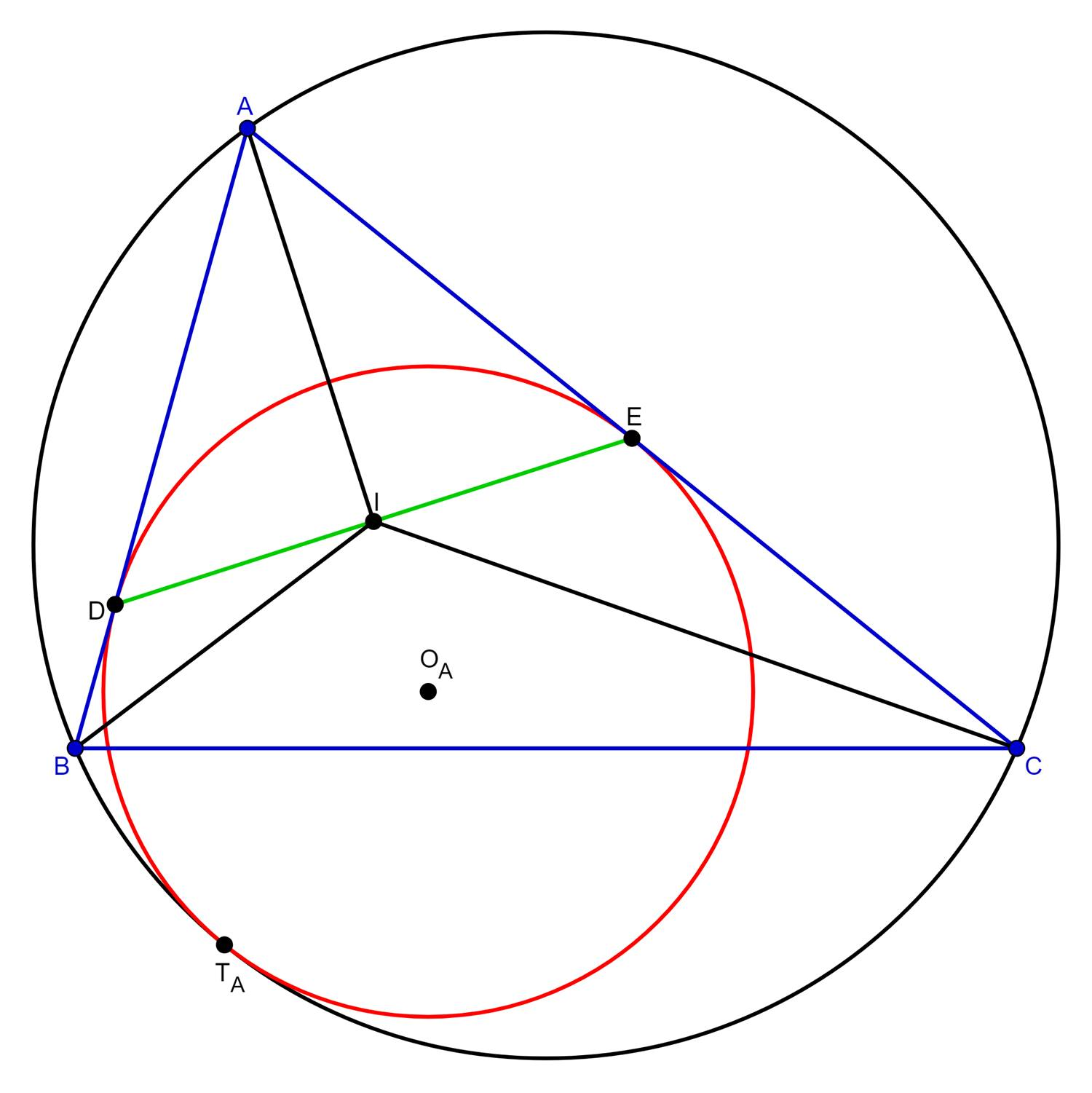
$A$-Mixtilinear incircle of triangle $ABC$

== Proof of existence and uniqueness ==
The $A$-excircle of triangle $ABC$ is unique. Let $\Phi$ be a transformation defined by the composition of an inversion centered at $A$ with radius $\sqrt{AB \cdot AC}$ and a reflection with respect to the angle bisector on $A$. Since inversion and reflection are bijective and preserve touching points, then $\Phi$ does as well. Then, the image of the $A$-excircle under $\Phi$ is a circle internally tangent to sides $AB, AC$ and the circumcircle of $ABC$, that is, the $A$-mixtilinear incircle. Therefore, the $A$-mixtilinear incircle exists and is unique, and a similar argument can prove the same for the mixtilinear incircles corresponding to $B$ and $C$.

== Construction ==
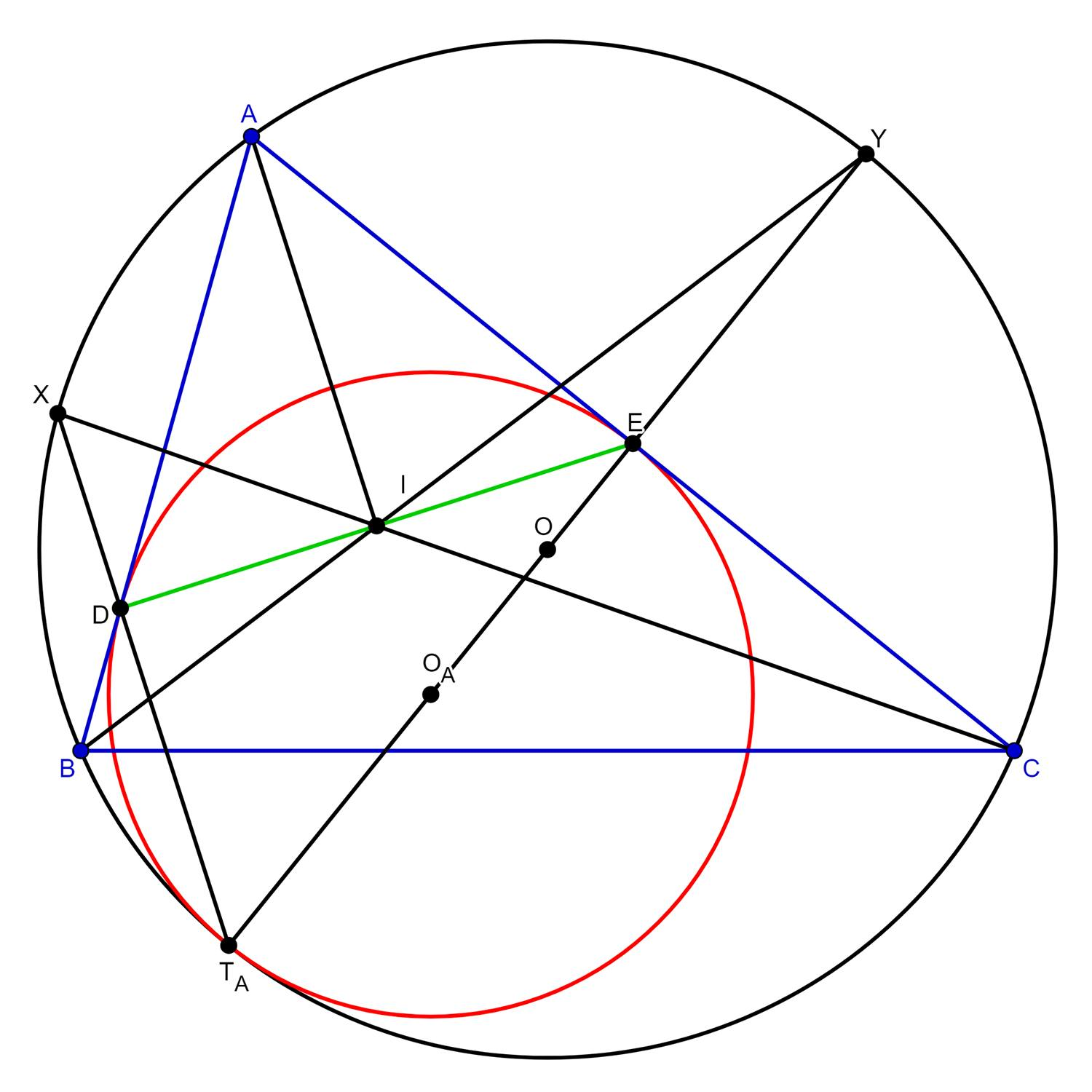
The hexagon $XCABYT_A$ and the intersections $D, I, E$ of its 3 pairs of opposite sides.

The $A$-mixtilinear incircle can be constructed with the following sequence of steps.

1. Draw the incenter $I$ by intersecting angle bisectors.
2. Draw a line through $I$ perpendicular to the line $AI$, touching lines $AB$ and $AC$ at points $D$ and $E$ respectively. These are the tangent points of the mixtilinear circle.
3. Draw perpendiculars to $AB$ and $AC$ through points $D$ and $E$ respectively and intersect them in $O_A$. $O_A$ is the center of the circle, so a circle with center $O_A$ and radius $O_AE$ is the mixtilinear incircle

This construction is possible because of the following fact:

=== Verrier's lemma ===
The incenter is the midpoint of the touching points of the mixtilinear incircle with the two sides.

=== Proof ===
Let $\Gamma$ be the circumcircle of triangle $ABC$ and $T_A$ be the tangency point of the $A$-mixtilinear incircle $\Omega_A$ and $\Gamma$. Let $X \neq T_A$ be the intersection of line $T_AD$ with $\Gamma$ and $Y \neq T_A$ be the intersection of line $T_AE$ with $\Gamma$. Homothety with center on $T_A$ between $\Omega_A$ and $\Gamma$ implies that $X, Y$ are the midpoints of $\Gamma$ arcs $AB$ and $AC$ respectively. The inscribed angle theorem implies that $X, I, C$ and $Y, I, B$ are triples of collinear points. Pascal's theorem on hexagon $XCABYT_A$ inscribed in $\Gamma$ implies that $D, I, E$ are collinear. Since the angles $\angle{DAI}$ and $\angle{IAE}$ are equal, it follows that $I$ is the midpoint of segment $DE$.

== Other properties ==
=== Radius ===
The following formula relates the radius $r$ of the incircle and the radius $\rho_A$ of the $A$-mixtilinear incircle of a triangle $ABC$:
$$r = \rho_A \cdot \cos^2{\frac{\alpha}{2}}$$

where $\alpha$ is the magnitude of the angle at $A$.

=== Relationship with points on the circumcircle ===
- The midpoint of the arc $BC$ that contains point $A$ is on the line $T_AI$.
- The quadrilateral $T_AXAY$ is harmonic, which means that $T_AA$ is a symmedian on triangle $XT_AY$.

=== Circles related to the tangency point with the circumcircle ===
$T_ABDI$ and $T_ACEI$ are cyclic quadrilaterals.

=== Spiral similarities ===
$T_A$ is the center of a spiral similarity that maps $B, I$ to $I, C$ respectively.

== Relationship between the three mixtilinear incircles ==
=== Lines joining vertices and mixtilinear tangency points ===
The three lines joining a vertex to the point of contact of the circumcircle with the corresponding mixtilinear incircle meet at the external center of similitude of the incircle and circumcircle. The Online Encyclopedia of Triangle Centers lists this point as X(56). It is defined by trilinear coordinates:
$$\frac{a}{b+c-a} : \frac{b}{c+a-b} : \frac{c}{a+b-c},$$
and barycentric coordinates:
$$\frac{a^2}{b+c-a} : \frac{b^2}{c+a-b} : \frac{c^2}{a+b-c}.$$

=== Radical center ===
The radical center of the three mixtilinear incircles is the point $J$ which divides $OI$ in the ratio:
$$OJ:JI=2R:-r$$
where $I, r, O, R$ are the incenter, inradius, circumcenter and circumradius respectively.
