= Xenorhipidini =

Scientific classification
- Kingdom: Animalia
- Phylum: Arthropoda
- Clade: Pancrustacea
- Class: Insecta
- Order: Coleoptera
- Suborder: Polyphaga
- Infraorder: Elateriformia
- Family: Buprestidae
- Subfamily: Buprestinae
- Tribe: Xenorhipidini; Cobos, 1986

Tribe of beetles

Xenorhipidini is a tribe of metallic wood-boring beetles in the family Buprestidae. There are about 8 described species in Xenorhipidini.

== Genera ==
- Hesperorhipis Fall, 1930
- Trichinorhipis Barr, 1948
- Xenorhipis LeConte, 1866
