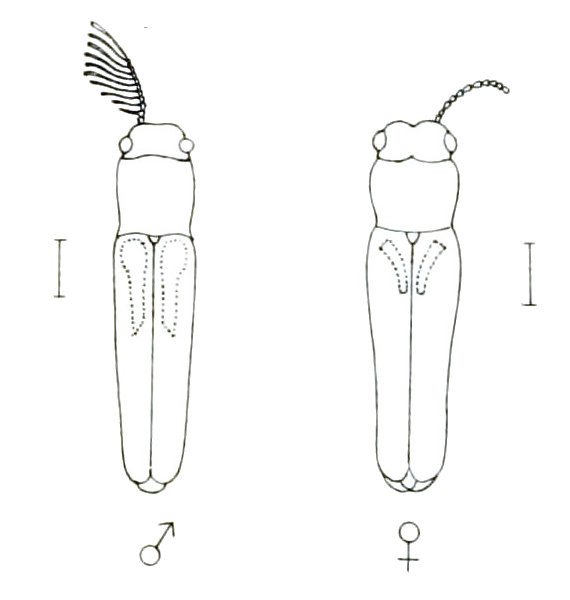
- Xenorhipis brendeli

Scientific classification
- Kingdom: Animalia
- Phylum: Arthropoda
- Class: Insecta
- Order: Coleoptera
- Suborder: Polyphaga
- Infraorder: Elateriformia
- Family: Buprestidae
- Subtribe: Xenorhipidina
- Genus: Xenorhipis; LeConte, 1866

= Xenorhipis =

Genus of beetles

Xenorhipis is a genus of beetles in the family Buprestidae, subfamily Buprestinae, and tribe Xenorhipidini. They are native to the Americas.

Species include:

- Xenorhipis acunai (Fisher, 1936)
- Xenorhipis alvarengi Cobos, 1964
- Xenorhipis bajacalifornica Westcott, 2008
- Xenorhipis brendeli LeConte, 1866
- Xenorhipis hidalgoensis Knull, 1952
- Xenorhipis klapperichorum (Nelson, 1978)
- Xenorhipis mexicana Nelson, 1968
- Xenorhipis meyeri Cobos, 1968
- Xenorhipis orinocoensis Bellamy, 1991
- Xenorhipis osborni Knull, 1936
- Xenorhipis parallela (Waterhouse, 1889)
- Xenorhipis prosopis Menley, 1985
- Xenorhipis strandi (Obenberger, 1928)
- Xenorhipis suturalis (Westwood, 1883)
- Xenorhipis vauriei Cazier, 1952
