= Hesperorhipis =

Scientific classification
- Kingdom: Animalia
- Phylum: Arthropoda
- Class: Insecta
- Order: Coleoptera
- Suborder: Polyphaga
- Infraorder: Elateriformia
- Family: Buprestidae
- Tribe: Xenorhipidini
- Subtribe: Xenorhipidina
- Genus: Hesperorhipis; Fall, 1930

Genus of beetles

Hesperorhipis is a genus of beetles in the family Buprestidae, subfamily Buprestinae, and tribe Xenorhipidini containing the following species:

- Hesperorhipis albofasciata Fall, 1930
- Hesperorhipis hyperbola Knull, 1938
- Hesperorhipis jacumbae Knull, 1954
- Hesperorhipis mirabilis Knull, 1937
