= Encyclopedia of Triangle Centers =

List of points considered center of a triangle

The Encyclopedia of Triangle Centers (ETC) is an online list of thousands of points or "centers" associated with the geometry of a triangle. This resource is hosted at the University of Evansville. It started from a list of 400 triangle centers published in the 1998 book Triangle Centers and Central Triangles by Clark Kimberling.

As of 13 November 2026, the list identifies 73,300 triangle centers and is managed cooperatively by an international team of geometry researchers. The encyclopedia is integrated into Geogebra.

Each point in the list is identified by an index number of the form X(n) —for example, X(1) is the incenter. The information recorded about each point includes its trilinear and barycentric coordinates and its relation to lines joining other identified points. Links to The Geometer's Sketchpad diagrams are provided for key points. The encyclopedia also includes a glossary of terms and definitions.

Each point in the list is assigned a distinct name. In cases where no particular name arises from geometrical or historical considerations, the name of a star is used instead. For example, the 770th point in the list is named point Acamar.

The encyclopedia is presented in parts (Part 1, Part 2, etc.). As of 12 August 2026, there are 37 Parts. In order to enable searching for names, terms, and sources across all the Parts, a Guide to Preambles in the Encyclopedia of Triangle Centers was made accessible in August 2026.

== Notable points ==
The first 10 points listed in the encyclopedia are:

ETC reference	Name	Definition
X(1)	Incenter	center of the incircle
X(2)	Centroid	intersection of the three medians
X(3)	Circumcenter	center of the circumscribed circle
X(4)	Orthocenter	intersection of the three altitudes
X(5)	Nine-point center	center of the nine-point circle
X(6)	Symmedian point	intersection of the three symmedians
X(7)	Gergonne point	symmedian point of contact triangle
X(8)	Nagel point	intersection of lines from each vertex to the corresponding semiperimeter point
X(9)	Mittenpunkt	symmedian point of the triangle formed by the centers of the three excircles
X(10)	Spieker center	center of the Spieker circle

Other points with entries in the encyclopedia include:

ETC reference	Name
X(11)	Feuerbach point
X(13)	Fermat point
X(15), X(16)	First and second isodynamic points
X(17), X(18)	First and second Napoleon points
X(19)	Clawson point
X(20)	De Longchamps point
X(21)	Schiffler point
X(22)	Exeter point
X(39)	Brocard midpoint
X(40)	Bevan point
X(54)	Kosnita point
X(175)	Isoperimetric point
X(176)	Equal detour point
X(356)	Morley center
X(357)	First Morley–Taylor–Marr center
X(359)	Hofstadter one-point
X(360)	Hofstadter zero-point

The encyclopedia also contains a list of notable bicentric pairs of points which are not by themselves triangle centers, such as the Brocard points.

Similar, albeit shorter, lists exist for quadri-figures (quadrilaterals and systems of four lines) and polygon geometry.

== See also ==
- Catalogue of Triangle Cubics
- List of triangle topics
- Triangle center
- The Secrets of Triangles
- Modern triangle geometry
