= Morley's trisector theorem =

3 intersections of any triangle's adjacent angle trisectors form an equilateral triangle

If each vertex angle of the outer triangle is trisected, Morley's trisector theorem states that the purple triangle will be equilateral.

In plane geometry, Morley's trisector theorem states that in any triangle, the three points of intersection of the adjacent angle trisectors form an equilateral triangle, called the first Morley triangle or simply the Morley triangle. The theorem was discovered in 1899 by Anglo-American mathematician Frank Morley. It has various generalizations; in particular, if all the trisectors are intersected, one obtains four other equilateral triangles.

== Proofs ==
There are many proofs of Morley's theorem. Several early proofs were based on delicate trigonometric calculations. Recent proofs include an algebraic proof by Alain Connes (1998, 2004) extending the theorem to general fields other than characteristic three, and John Conway's elementary geometry proof. The latter starts with an equilateral triangle and shows that a triangle may be built around it which will be similar to any selected triangle. Morley's theorem does not hold in spherical and hyperbolic geometry.

Fig 1. Elementary proof of Morley's trisector theorem

One proof uses the trigonometric identity

$\sin(3\theta)=4\sin\theta\sin(60^\circ+\theta)\sin(120^\circ+\theta)$	1

which, by using of the sum of two angles identity, can be shown to be equal to

$$\sin(3\theta)=-4\sin^3\theta+3\sin\theta.$$

The last equation can be verified by applying the sum of two angles identity to the left side twice and eliminating the cosine.

Points $D, E, F$ are constructed on $\overline{BC}$ as shown. We have $3\alpha+3\beta+3\gamma=180^\circ$, the sum of any triangle's angles, so $\alpha+\beta+\gamma=60^\circ.$ Therefore, the angles of triangle $XEF$ are $\alpha, (60^\circ+\beta),$ and $(60^\circ+\gamma).$

From the figure

$\sin(60^\circ+\beta)=\frac{\overline{DX}}{\overline{XE}}$	2

and

$\sin(60^\circ+\gamma)=\frac{\overline{DX}}{\overline{XF}}.$	3

Also from the figure

$$\angle{AYC}=180^\circ-\alpha-\gamma=120^\circ+\beta$$

and

$\angle{AZB}=120^\circ+\gamma.$	4

The law of sines applied to triangles $AYC$ and $AZB$ yields

$\sin(120^\circ+\beta)=\frac{\overline{AC}}{\overline{AY}}\sin\gamma$	5

and

$\sin(120^\circ+\gamma)=\frac{\overline{AB}}{\overline{AZ}}\sin\beta.$	6

Express the height of triangle $ABC$ in two ways

$$h=\overline{AB} \sin(3\beta)=\overline{AB}\cdot 4\sin\beta\sin(60^\circ+\beta)\sin(120^\circ+\beta)$$

and

$$h=\overline{AC} \sin(3\gamma)=\overline{AC}\cdot 4\sin\gamma\sin(60^\circ+\gamma)\sin(120^\circ+\gamma).$$

where equation (1) was used to replace $\sin(3\beta)$ and $\sin(3\gamma)$ in these two equations. Substituting equations (2) and (5) in the $\beta$ equation and equations (3) and (6) in the $\gamma$ equation gives

$$h=4\overline{AB}\sin\beta\cdot\frac{\overline{DX}}{\overline{XE}}\cdot\frac{\overline{AC}}{\overline{AY}}\sin\gamma$$

and

$$h=4\overline{AC}\sin\gamma\cdot\frac{\overline{DX}}{\overline{XF}}\cdot\frac{\overline{AB}}{\overline{AZ}}\sin\beta$$

Since the numerators are equal

$$\overline{XE}\cdot\overline{AY}=\overline{XF}\cdot\overline{AZ}$$

or

$$\frac{\overline{XE}}{\overline{XF}}=\frac{\overline{AZ}}{\overline{AY}}.$$

Since angle $EXF$ and angle $ZAY$ are equal and the sides forming these angles are in the same ratio, triangles $XEF$ and $AZY$ are similar.

Similar angles $AYZ$ and $XFE$ equal $(60^\circ+\gamma)$, and similar angles $AZY$ and $XEF$ equal $(60^\circ+\beta).$ Similar arguments yield the base angles of triangles $BXZ$ and $CYX.$

In particular angle $BZX$ is found to be $(60^\circ+\alpha)$ and from the figure we see that

$$\angle{AZY}+\angle{AZB}+\angle{BZX}+\angle{XZY}=360^\circ.$$

Substituting yields

$$(60^\circ+\beta)+(120^\circ+\gamma)+(60^\circ+\alpha)+\angle{XZY}=360^\circ$$

where equation (4) was used for angle $AZB$ and therefore

$$\angle{XZY}=60^\circ.$$

Similarly the other angles of triangle $XYZ$ are found to be $60^\circ.$

== Side and area ==
The first Morley triangle has side lengths

$$a^\prime=b^\prime=c^\prime=8R\,\sin\tfrac13A\,\sin\tfrac13B\,\sin\tfrac13C,$$

where R is the circumradius of the original triangle and A, B, and C are the angles of the original triangle. Since the area of an equilateral triangle is $\tfrac{\sqrt{3}}{4}a'^2,$ the area of Morley's triangle can be expressed as

$$\text{Area} = 16 \sqrt{3}R^2\, \sin^2\!\tfrac13A\, \sin^2\!\tfrac13B\, \sin^2\!\tfrac13C.$$

== Morley's triangles ==
Morley's theorem entails 18 equilateral triangles. The triangle described in the trisector theorem above, called the first Morley triangle, has vertices given in trilinear coordinates relative to a triangle ABC as follows:

$$\begin{array}{ccccccc}
A \text{-vertex} &=& 1 &:& 2 \cos\tfrac13 C &:& 2 \cos\tfrac13 B \\[5mu]
B \text{-vertex} &=& 2 \cos\tfrac13 C &:& 1 &:& 2 \cos\tfrac13 A \\[5mu]
C \text{-vertex} &=& 2 \cos\tfrac13 B &:& 2 \cos\tfrac13 A &:& 1
\end{array}$$

Another of Morley's equilateral triangles that is also a central triangle is called the second Morley triangle and is given by these vertices:

$$\begin{array}{ccccccc}
A \text{-vertex} &=& 1 &:& 2 \cos\tfrac13(C - 2\pi) &:& 2 \cos\tfrac13(B - 2\pi) \\[5mu]
B \text{-vertex} &=& 2 \cos\tfrac13(C - 2\pi) &:& 1 &:& 2 \cos\tfrac13(A - 2\pi) \\[5mu]
C \text{-vertex} &=& 2 \cos\tfrac13(B - 2\pi) &:& 2 \cos\tfrac13(A - 2\pi) &:& 1
\end{array}$$

The third of Morley's 18 equilateral triangles that is also a central triangle is called the third Morley triangle and is given by these vertices:

$$\begin{array}{ccccccc}
A \text{-vertex} &=& 1 &:& 2 \cos\tfrac13(C + 2\pi) &:& 2 \cos\tfrac13(B + 2\pi) \\[5mu]
B \text{-vertex} &=& 2 \cos\tfrac13(C + 2\pi) &:& 1 &:& 2 \cos\tfrac13(A + 2\pi) \\[5mu]
C \text{-vertex} &=& 2 \cos\tfrac13(B + 2\pi) &:& 2 \cos\tfrac13(A + 2\pi) &:& 1
\end{array}$$

The first, second, and third Morley triangles are pairwise homothetic. Another homothetic triangle is formed by the three points X on the circumcircle of triangle ABC at which the line XX^{−1} is tangent to the circumcircle, where X^{−1} denotes the isogonal conjugate of X. This equilateral triangle, called the circumtangential triangle, has these vertices:

$$\begin{array}{lllllll}
A \text{-vertex} &=& \phantom{-}\csc\tfrac13(C - B) &:& \phantom{-}\csc\tfrac13(2C + B) &:& -\csc\tfrac13(C + 2B) \\[5mu]
B \text{-vertex} &=& -\csc\tfrac13(A + 2C) &:& \phantom{-}\csc\tfrac13(A - C) &:& \phantom{-}\csc\tfrac13(2A + C) \\[5mu]
C \text{-vertex} &=& \phantom{-}\csc\tfrac13(2B + A) &:& -\csc\tfrac13(B + 2A) &:& \phantom{-}\csc\tfrac13(B - A)
\end{array}$$

A fifth equilateral triangle, also homothetic to the others, is obtained by rotating the circumtangential triangle π/6 about its center. Called the circumnormal triangle, its vertices are as follows:

$$\begin{array}{lllllll}
A \text{-vertex} &=& \phantom{-}\sec\tfrac13(C - B) &:& -\sec\tfrac13(2C + B) &:& -\sec\tfrac13(C + 2B) \\[5mu]
B \text{-vertex} &=& -\sec\tfrac13(A + 2C) &:& \phantom{-}\sec\tfrac13(A - C) &:& -\sec\tfrac13(2A + C) \\[5mu]
C \text{-vertex} &=& -\sec\tfrac13(2B + A) &:& -\sec\tfrac13(B + 2A) &:& \phantom{-}\sec\tfrac13(B - A)
\end{array}$$

An operation called "extraversion" can be used to obtain one of the 18 Morley triangles from another. Each triangle can be extraverted in three different ways; the 18 Morley triangles and 27 extravert pairs of triangles form the 18 vertices and 27 edges of the Pappus graph.

== Related triangle centers ==
The Morley center, X(356), centroid of the first Morley triangle, is given in trilinear coordinates by

$$\cos\tfrac13A + 2\cos\tfrac13B\,\cos\tfrac13C \,:\, \cos\tfrac13B + 2\cos\tfrac13C\,\cos\tfrac13A \,:\, \cos\tfrac13C + 2\cos\tfrac13A\,\cos\tfrac13B$$

1st Morley–Taylor–Marr center, X(357): The first Morley triangle is perspective to triangle $\triangle ABC$ :<< the lines each connecting a vertex of the original triangle with the opposite vertex of the Morley triangle concur at the point

$$\sec\tfrac13A \,:\, \sec\tfrac13B \,:\, \sec\tfrac13C$$

== See also ==
- Angle trisection
- Hofstadter points
- Morley centers
