= Václav Jeřábek =

Czech mathematician (1845–1931)

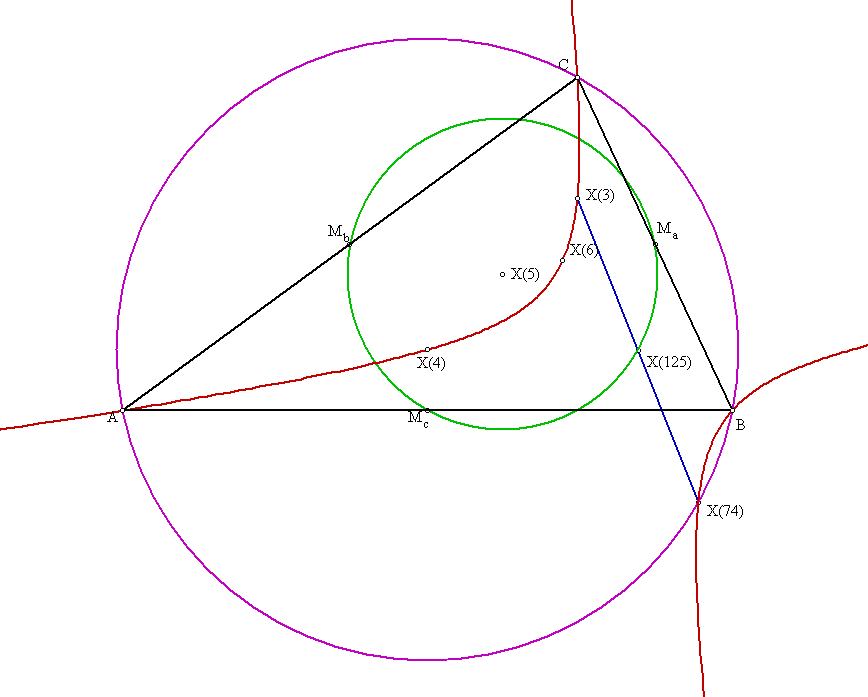
- Jerabek Hyperbola
- Born: December 11, 1845; Koloděje, Pardubice Region, Austrian Empire; now Czech Republic
- Died: December 20, 1931 (aged 86); Telč, Czechoslovakia; now Czech Republic
- Education: Vienna Polytechnic Institute
- Scientific career
- Fields: Mathematics
- Workplaces: Czech Realschule of Brno

Václav Jeřábek (1845–1931) was a Czech mathematician, specialized in constructive geometry.

== Life and work ==
Jeřábek studied at the lower school of Pardubice and at the higher school of Písek, then he was to Vienna and studied at Imperial and Royal Polytechnic Institute where he graduated. Although he participated in several leading intellectual circles of Vienna, he remained a Czech with a clear view of patriotism. He began his teaching at the Realschule of Litomyšl (1870), being transferred two years after to the Realschule of Telč. In 1881, he was appointed professor of the Czech Realschule in Brno, and became its director in 1901. He retired in 1907, and suffering of a cataract, he died almost completely blind in 1931.

Jeřábek was one of the men who kept the Czech geometry at the scientific level. He published scientific articles in Czech, German and French, and longer lectures. He is well remembered by the Jerabek hyperbola, the locus of the isogonal conjugate of a point that traverses the Euler line of a triangle.

He was honorary member of the Union of Czech mathematicians and member of the scientific societies of Moravia and Bohemia.

== Bibliography ==
- Kimberling, Clark (1997). "Major Centers of Triangles". The American Mathematical Monthly. 104 (5): 431–438. doi:10.1080/00029890.1997.11990660. ISSN 0002-9890. JSTOR 2974736.
- Kimberling, Clark (2003). Geometry in action. Key College Publishing. ISBN 1-931914-02-8.
- Roháček, J. (1932). "Václav Jeřábek [nekrolog]". Časopis Pro Pěstování Matematiky a Fysiky (in Czech). 61 (4): 105–108. doi:10.21136/CPMF.1932.121310. hdl:10338.dmlcz/121310. ISSN 1802-114X.
