= Hesperorhipis hyperbola =

Scientific classification
- Kingdom: Animalia
- Phylum: Arthropoda
- Clade: Pancrustacea
- Class: Insecta
- Order: Coleoptera
- Suborder: Polyphaga
- Infraorder: Elateriformia
- Family: Buprestidae
- Genus: Hesperorhipis
- Species: H. hyperbola

Binomial name
- Hesperorhipis hyperbola Knull, 1938

Species of beetle

Hesperorhipis hyperbola is a species of metallic wood-boring beetles in the family Buprestidae. It is found in North America.

== Subspecies ==
- Hesperorhipis hyperbola californica Knull, 1947
- Hesperorhipis hyperbola hyperbola Knull, 1938
