= Groupe GEOS =

French private intelligence and risk consulting firm

GEOS is an international corporation based in France. The core activity of the group is risk management.

== Chronology ==
=== Establishment ===
GEOS was set up in 1997. The ambition of the group’s founders, Stéphane Gérardin and Thierry Laulom, was to deliver a French security management solution for companies faced with criminal threats and political risk.

=== Business development ===
In the beginning, the main activity of the company was security escort for dignitaries and security audits in Algeria. The service package was gradually expanded; in 2000 the group delivered a range of services in geographical zones including Africa, South-East Asia and North America. As of 2004, the group saw turnover increase making the opening of the company’s capital to investors possible. Continental Risk, a holding company, acquired 34% of the group’s capital. The firm is owned by Guillaume Verspieren.

=== 2008: Reinforcement of share capital ===
With turnover of 34 million euro recorded in 2008 the expansion of the Group led to the reinforcement of shareholder positions, with Continental Risk currently holding the majority stake of the company. Guillaume Verspieren was named Chief Executive Officer of the Group.

== See also ==
- Business intelligence
- Due diligence
