= Isoperimetric point =

Triangle center

In geometry, the isoperimetric point is a triangle center — a special point associated with a plane triangle. The term was originally introduced by G.R. Veldkamp in a paper published in the American Mathematical Monthly in 1985 to denote a point P in the plane of a triangle △ABC having the property that the triangles △PBC, △PCA, △PAB have equal perimeters, that is, having the property that

$$\begin{align}
& \overline{PB} + \overline{BC} + \overline{CP}, \\
=\ & \overline{PC} + \overline{CA} + \overline{AP}, \\
=\ & \overline{PA} + \overline{AB} + \overline{BP}.
\end{align}$$

Isoperimetric points in the sense of Veldkamp exist only for triangles satisfying certain conditions. The isoperimetric point of △ABC in the sense of Veldkamp, if it exists, has the following trilinear coordinates.

$$\sec\tfrac{A}{2} \cos\tfrac{B}{2} \cos\tfrac{C}{2} - 1 \ : \  \sec\tfrac{B}{2} \cos\tfrac{C}{2} \cos\tfrac{A}{2} - 1 \ : \ \sec\tfrac{C}{2} \cos\tfrac{A}{2} \cos\tfrac{B}{2} - 1$$

Given any triangle △ABC one can associate with it a point P having trilinear coordinates as given above. This point is a triangle center and in Clark Kimberling's Encyclopedia of Triangle Centers (ETC) it is called the isoperimetric point of the triangle △ABC. It is designated as the triangle center X(175). The point X(175) need not be an isoperimetric point of triangle △ABC in the sense of Veldkamp. However, if isoperimetric point of triangle △ABC in the sense of Veldkamp exists, then it would be identical to the point X(175).

The point P with the property that the triangles △PBC, △PCA, △PAB have equal perimeters has been studied as early as 1890 in an article by Emile Lemoine.

== Existence of isoperimetric point in the sense of Veldkamp ==
A triangle △ABC in which the triangle center X(175) is not the isoperimetric point in the sense of Veldkamp.

Let △ABC be any triangle. Let the sidelengths of this triangle be a, b, c. Let its circumradius be R and inradius be r. The necessary and sufficient condition for the existence of an isoperimetric point in the sense of Veldkamp can be stated as follows.

The triangle △ABC has an isoperimetric point in the sense of Veldkamp if and only if
$$a + b + c > 4R + r.$$

For all acute angled triangles △ABC we have a + b + c > 4R + r, and so all acute angled triangles have isoperimetric points in the sense of Veldkamp.

== Properties ==
Let P denote the triangle center X(175) of triangle △ABC.

- P lies on the line joining the incenter and the Gergonne point of △ABC.
- If P is an isoperimetric point of △ABC in the sense of Veldkamp, then the excircles of triangles △PBC, △PCA, △PAB are pairwise tangent to one another and P is their radical center.
- If P is an isoperimetric point of △ABC in the sense of Veldkamp, then the perimeters of △PBC, △PCA, △PAB are equal to

$$\frac{2 \triangle}{\bigl| 4R + r - (a+b+c) \bigr|}$$
where △ is the area, R is the circumradius, r is the inradius, and a, b, c are the sidelengths of △ABC.

== Soddy circles ==
Inner and outer Soddy circles in the case where the outer Soddy point is an isoperimetric point in the sense of Veldkamp.

Inner and outer Soddy circles in the case where the outer Soddy point is not an isoperimetric point in the sense of Veldkamp.

Given a triangle △ABC one can draw circles in the plane of △ABC with centers at A, B, C such that they are tangent to each other externally. In general, one can draw two new circles such that each of them is tangential to the three circles with A, B, C as centers. (One of the circles may degenerate into a straight line.) These circles are the Soddy circles of △ABC. The circle with the smaller radius is the inner Soddy circle and its center is called the inner Soddy point or inner Soddy center of △ABC. The circle with the larger radius is the outer Soddy circle and its center is called the outer Soddy point or outer Soddy center of triangle △ABC.

The triangle center X(175), the isoperimetric point in the sense of Kimberling, is the outer Soddy point of △ABC.
