= Benjamin Bevan =

British civil engineer (1773–1833)

Benjamin Bevan (26 December 1773 — 2 July 1833) was a British civil engineer, noted for his proof of the equivalence of the elastic moduli of ice and water. He was a principal engineer on the Grand Junction Canal.

Bevan was born on Boxing Day in 1773; his parents were Joseph Bevan, a yeoman of Ridgmont, and Mary Ravens. He inherited his father's farm and holdings at the age of nine. He had five children with his wife Mary Allen, whom he married in 1799. Prior to entering the engineering profession, he worked as a brewer, but was encouraged to take up engineering after meeting the geologist William Smith.

In 1802 he completed his first engineering project; a redesign of the Lake Bridge at Leighton Buzzard. Two years later he began working on canals, first working on the Wendover branch of the Grand Junction, and later taking over (along with John Woodhouse and Henry Provis) from the canal's original engineer James Barnes. On this canal, Bevan pioneered the use of iron as a material for aqueducts, constructing one of Britain's earliest iron aqueducts over the River Great Ouse. The work he did on the Grand Junction led to his involvement in other canal construction projects, including the original Grand Union Canal and the Newport Pagnell Canal (although he declined the post of chief engineer for the Wey and Arun Canal).

He did extensive surveying work, looking at means of creating navigable stretches of the River Ivel and River Nene, and proposing canals between Market Harborough and Stamford and a branch out as far as Taunton. His survey of Deeping Fen resulted in an Act allowing the provision of steam engines for drainage, one of the earliest uses of steam power for this purpose.

In later life, he developed an interest in materials science and meteorology, writing numerous scientific papers. He served on the committee which established the London Mechanics' Institution, and introduced George Birkbeck as the chair.

He died from heart failure on 2 July 1833 whilst observing a lunar eclipse, and was interred at Ridgmont.
