= Sylvester's theorem =

Sylvester's theorem or the Sylvester theorem may refer to any of several theorems named after James Joseph Sylvester:

- The Sylvester–Gallai theorem, on the existence of a line with only two of n given points.
- Sylvester's determinant identity.
- Sylvester's matrix theorem, also called Sylvester's formula, for a matrix function in terms of eigenvalues.
- Sylvester's law of inertia, also called Sylvester's rigidity theorem, about the signature of a quadratic form.
- Sylvester's theorem on the product of k consecutive integers > k, that generalizes Bertrand's postulate.
- Sylvester's theorem on partitions.
- Sylvester theorem on spherical harmonics.
- Sylvester's criterion, a characterization of positive-definite Hermitian matrices.
- Sylvester’s inequality about the rank (linear algebra) of the product of two matrices.
- Sylvester's closed solution for the Frobenius coin problem when there are only two coins.
- Sylvester's triangle problem, a particular geometric representation of the sum of three vectors of equal length

The Weinstein–Aronszajn identity, stating that det(I + AB) = det(I + BA), for matrices A, B, is sometimes attributed to Sylvester.

== See also ==
- List of topics named after James Joseph Sylvester
