= Collinearity =

Property of points all lying on a single line

In geometry, collinearity of a set of points is the property of their lying on a single line. A set of points with this property is said to be collinear (sometimes spelled as colinear). In greater generality, the term has been used for aligned objects, that is, things being "in a line" or "in a row".

== Points on a line ==
Collinear vectors in a cartesian coordinate system.

In any geometry, the set of points on a line are said to be collinear. In Euclidean geometry this relation is intuitively visualized by points lying in a row on a "straight line". However, in most geometries (including Euclidean) a line is typically a primitive (undefined) object type, so such visualizations will not necessarily be appropriate. A model for the geometry offers an interpretation of how the points, lines and other object types relate to one another and a notion such as collinearity must be interpreted within the context of that model. For instance, in spherical geometry, where lines are represented in the standard model by great circles of a sphere, sets of collinear points lie on the same great circle. Such points do not lie on a "straight line" in the Euclidean sense, and are not thought of as being in a row.

A mapping of a geometry to itself which sends lines to lines is called a collineation; it preserves the collinearity property. The linear maps (or linear functions) of vector spaces, viewed as geometric maps, map lines to lines; that is, they map collinear point sets to collinear point sets and so, are collineations. In projective geometry these linear mappings are called homographies and are just one type of collineation.

== Examples in Euclidean geometry ==
=== Triangles ===
In any triangle the following sets of points are collinear:

- The orthocenter, the circumcenter, the centroid, the Exeter point, the de Longchamps point, and the center of the nine-point circle are collinear, all falling on a line called the Euler line.
- The de Longchamps point also has other collinearities.
- Any vertex, the tangency of the opposite side with an excircle, and the Nagel point are collinear in a line called a splitter of the triangle.
- The midpoint of any side, the point that is equidistant from it along the triangle's boundary in either direction (so these two points bisect the perimeter), and the center of the Spieker circle are collinear in a line called a cleaver of the triangle. (The Spieker circle is the incircle of the medial triangle, and its center is the center of mass of the perimeter of the triangle.)
- Any vertex, the tangency of the opposite side with the incircle, and the Gergonne point are collinear.
- From any point on the circumcircle of a triangle, the nearest points on each of the three extended sides of the triangle are collinear in the Simson line of the point on the circumcircle.
- The lines connecting the feet of the altitudes intersect the opposite sides at collinear points.
- A triangle's incenter, the midpoint of an altitude, and the point of contact of the corresponding side with the excircle relative to that side are collinear.
- Menelaus' theorem states that three points $P_1, P_2, P_3$ on the sides (some extended) of a triangle opposite vertices $A_1,A_2, A_3$ respectively are collinear if and only if the following products of segment lengths are equal:

$$P_1A_2 \cdot P_2A_3 \cdot P_3A_1=P_1A_3 \cdot P_2A_1 \cdot P_3A_2.$$

- The incenter, the centroid, and the Spieker circle's center are collinear.
- The circumcenter, the Brocard midpoint, and the Lemoine point of a triangle are collinear.
- Two perpendicular lines intersecting at the orthocenter of a triangle each intersect each of the triangle's extended sides. The midpoints on the three sides of these points of intersection are collinear in the Droz–Farny line.

=== Quadrilaterals ===
- In a convex quadrilateral ABCD whose opposite sides intersect at E and F, the midpoints of A̅C̅, B̅D̅, E̅F̅ are collinear and the line through them is called the Newton line. If the quadrilateral is a tangential quadrilateral, then its incenter also lies on this line.
- In a convex quadrilateral, the quasiorthocenter H, the "area centroid" G, and the quasicircumcenter O are collinear in this order, and H̅G̅ = 2G̅O̅. (See Quadrilateral#Remarkable points and lines in a convex quadrilateral.)
- Other collinearities of a tangential quadrilateral are given in Tangential quadrilateral#Collinear points.
- In a cyclic quadrilateral, the circumcenter, the vertex centroid (the intersection of the two bimedians), and the anticenter are collinear.
- In a cyclic quadrilateral, the area centroid, the vertex centroid, and the intersection of the diagonals are collinear.
- In a tangential trapezoid, the tangencies of the incircle with the two bases are collinear with the incenter.
- In a tangential trapezoid, the midpoints of the legs are collinear with the incenter.

=== Hexagons ===
- Pascal's theorem (also known as the Hexagrammum Mysticum Theorem) states that if an arbitrary six points are chosen on a conic section (i.e., ellipse, parabola or hyperbola) and joined by line segments in any order to form a hexagon, then the three pairs of opposite sides of the hexagon (extended if necessary) meet in three points which lie on a straight line, called the Pascal line of the hexagon. The converse is also true: the Braikenridge–Maclaurin theorem states that if the three intersection points of the three pairs of lines through opposite sides of a hexagon lie on a line, then the six vertices of the hexagon lie on a conic, which may be degenerate as in Pappus's hexagon theorem.

=== Conic sections ===
- By Monge's theorem, for any three circles in a plane, none of which is completely inside one of the others, the three intersection points of the three pairs of lines, each externally tangent to two of the circles, are collinear.
- In an ellipse, the center, the two foci, and the two vertices with the smallest radius of curvature are collinear, and the center and the two vertices with the greatest radius of curvature are collinear.
- In a hyperbola, the center, the two foci, and the two vertices are collinear.

=== Cones ===
- The center of mass of a conic solid of uniform density lies one-quarter of the way from the center of the base to the vertex, on the straight line joining the two.

=== Tetrahedrons ===
- The centroid of a tetrahedron is the midpoint between its Monge point and circumcenter. These points define the Euler line of the tetrahedron that is analogous to the Euler line of a triangle. The center of the tetrahedron's twelve-point sphere also lies on the Euler line.

== Algebra ==
=== Collinearity of points whose coordinates are given ===
In coordinate geometry, in n-dimensional space, a set of three or more distinct points are collinear if and only if, the matrix of the coordinates of these vectors is of rank 1 or less. For example, given three points

$$\begin{align}
X &= (x_1,\ x_2,\ \dots,\ x_n), \\
Y &= (y_1,\ y_2,\ \dots,\ y_n), \\
Z &= (z_1,\ z_2,\ \dots,\ z_n),
\end{align}$$

if the matrix

$$\begin{bmatrix}
x_1 & x_2 & \dots & x_n  \\
y_1 & y_2 & \dots & y_n \\
z_1 & z_2 & \dots & z_n
\end{bmatrix}$$

is of rank 1 or less, the points are collinear.

Equivalently, for every subset of X, Y, Z, if the matrix

$$\begin{bmatrix}
1 & x_1 & x_2 & \dots & x_n  \\
1 & y_1 & y_2 & \dots & y_n \\
1 & z_1 & z_2 & \dots & z_n
\end{bmatrix}$$

is of rank 2 or less, the points are collinear. In particular, for three points in the plane (n = 2), the above matrix is square and the points are collinear if and only if its determinant is zero; since that 3 × 3 determinant is plus or minus twice the area of a triangle with those three points as vertices, this is equivalent to the statement that the three points are collinear if and only if the triangle with those points as vertices has zero area.

=== Collinearity of points whose pairwise distances are given ===
A set of at least three distinct points is called straight, meaning all the points are collinear, if and only if, for every three of those points A, B, C, the following determinant of a Cayley–Menger determinant is zero (with d(AB) meaning the distance between A and B, etc.):

$$\det \begin{bmatrix}
0 & d(AB)^2 & d(AC)^2 & 1 \\
d(AB)^2 &    0    & d(BC)^2 & 1 \\
d(AC)^2 & d(BC)^2 &       0 & 1 \\
1 &       1 &       1 & 0
\end{bmatrix} = 0.$$

This determinant is, by Heron's formula, equal to −16 times the square of the area of a triangle with side lengths d(AB), d(BC), d(AC); so checking if this determinant equals zero is equivalent to checking whether the triangle with vertices A, B, C has zero area (so the vertices are collinear).

Equivalently, a set of at least three distinct points are collinear if and only if, for every three of those points A, B, C with d(AC) greater than or equal to each of d(AB) and d(BC), the triangle inequality d(AC) ≤ d(AB) + d(BC) holds with equality.

== Number theory ==
Two numbers m and n are not coprime—that is, they share a common factor other than 1—if and only if for a rectangle plotted on a square lattice with vertices at (0, 0), (m, 0), (m, n), (0, n), at least one interior point is collinear with (0, 0) and (m, n).

== Concurrency (plane dual) ==
In various plane geometries the notion of interchanging the roles of "points" and "lines" while preserving the relationship between them is called plane duality. Given a set of collinear points, by plane duality we obtain a set of lines all of which meet at a common point. The property that this set of lines has (meeting at a common point) is called concurrency, and the lines are said to be concurrent lines. Thus, concurrency is the plane dual notion to collinearity.

== Collinearity graph ==
Given a partial geometry P, where two points determine at most one line, a collinearity graph of P is a graph whose vertices are the points of P, where two vertices are adjacent if and only if they determine a line in P.

== Usage in statistics and econometrics ==
In statistics, collinearity refers to a linear relationship between two explanatory variables. Two variables are perfectly collinear if there is an exact linear relationship between the two, so the correlation between them is equal to 1 or −1. That is, X_{1} and X_{2} are perfectly collinear if there exist parameters $\lambda_0$ and $\lambda_1$ such that, for all observations i, we have

$$X_{2i} = \lambda_0 + \lambda_1 X_{1i}.$$

This means that if the various observations (X_{1i}, X_{2i}) are plotted in the (X_{1}, X_{2}) plane, these points are collinear in the sense defined earlier in this article.

Perfect multicollinearity refers to a situation in which k (k ≥ 2) explanatory variables in a multiple regression model are perfectly linearly related, according to

$$X_{ki} = \lambda_0 + \lambda_1 X_{1i} + \lambda_2 X_{2i} + \dots + \lambda_{k-1} X_{(k-1),i}$$

for all observations i. In practice, we rarely face perfect multicollinearity in a data set. More commonly, the issue of multicollinearity arises when there is a "strong linear relationship" among two or more independent variables, meaning that

$$X_{ki} = \lambda_0 + \lambda_1 X_{1i} + \lambda_2 X_{2i} + \dots + \lambda_{k-1} X_{(k-1),i} + \varepsilon_i$$

where the variance of $\varepsilon_i$ is relatively small.

The concept of lateral collinearity expands on this traditional view, and refers to collinearity between explanatory and criteria (i.e., explained) variables.

== Usage in other areas ==
=== Antenna arrays ===
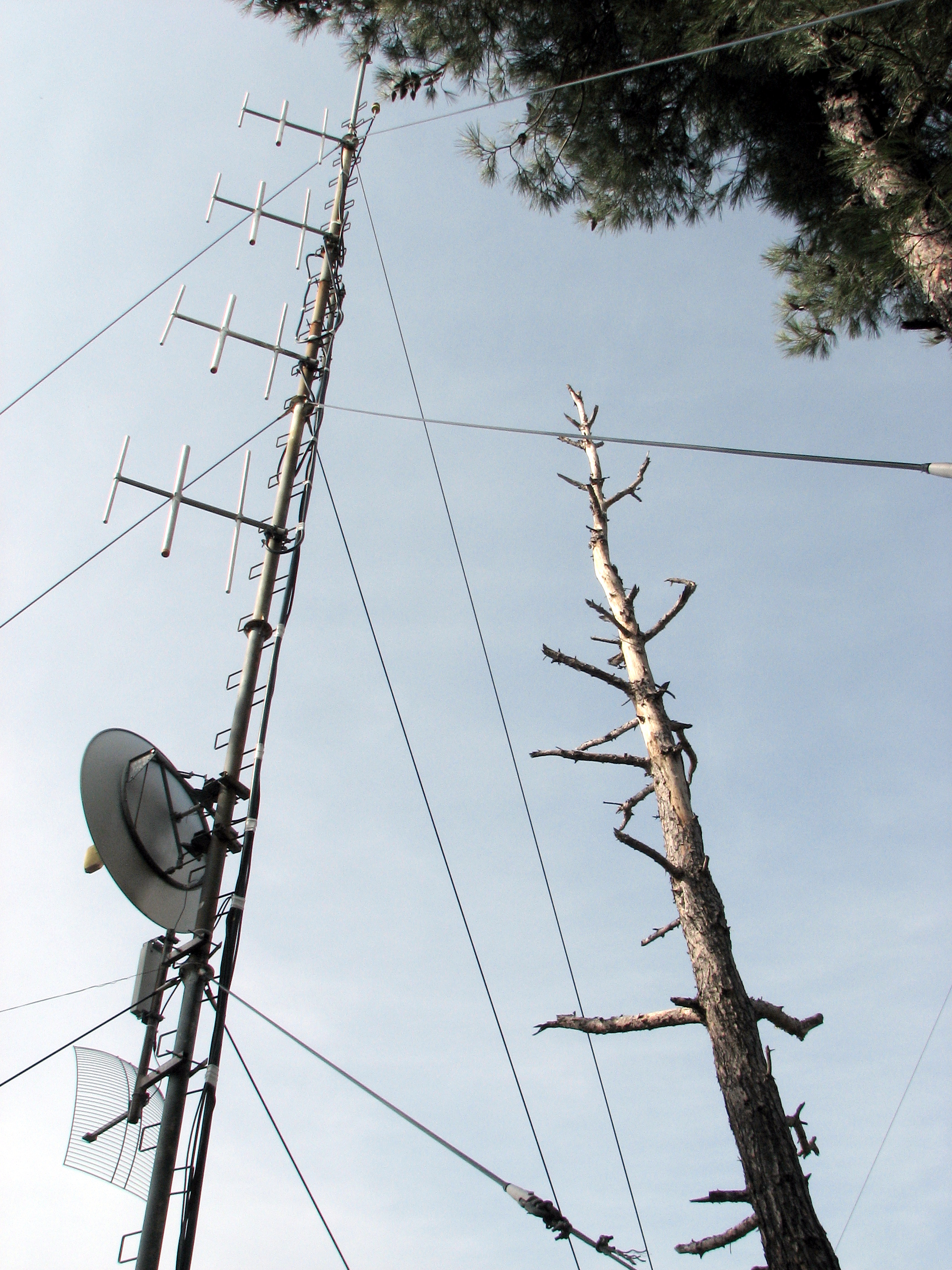
An antenna mast with four collinear directional arrays.

In telecommunications, a collinear (or co-linear) antenna array is an array of dipole antennas mounted in such a manner that the corresponding elements of each antenna are parallel and aligned, that is they are located along a common line or axis.

=== Photography ===
The collinearity equations are a set of two equations, used in photogrammetry and computer stereo vision, to relate coordinates in an image (sensor) plane (in two dimensions) to object coordinates (in three dimensions). In the photography setting, the equations are derived by considering the central projection of a point of the object through the optical centre of the camera to the image in the image (sensor) plane. The three points, object point, image point and optical centre, are always collinear. Another way to say this is that the line segments joining the object points with their image points are all concurrent at the optical centre.

== See also ==
- Concyclic points
- Coplanarity
- Direction (geometry)
- Incidence (geometry)#Collinearity
- No-three-in-line problem
- Pappus's hexagon theorem
