= List of things named after James Joseph Sylvester =

The mathematician J. J. Sylvester was known for his ability to coin new names and new notation for mathematical objects, not based on his own name. Nevertheless, many objects and results in mathematics have come to be named after him:

- The Sylvester–Gallai theorem, on the existence of a line with only two of n given points.
  - Sylvester–Gallai configuration, a set of points and lines without any two-point lines.
  - Sylvester matroid, a matroid without any two-point lines.
- Sylvester's determinant identity.
- Sylvester's matrix theorem, a.k.a. Sylvester's formula, for a matrix function in terms of eigenvalues.
- Sylvester's theorem on the product of k consecutive integers > k, that generalizes Bertrand's postulate.
- Sylvester's law of inertia a.k.a. Sylvester's rigidity theorem, about the signature of a quadratic form.
- Sylvester's identity about determinants of submatrices.
- Sylvester's criterion, a characterization of positive-definite Hermitian matrices.
- Sylvester domain.
- The Sylvester matrix for two polynomials.
- Sylvester's sequence, where each term is the product of previous terms plus one.
- Sylvester cyclotomic numbers.
- The Sylvester equation, AX + XB = C where A, B, C are given matrices and X is an unknown matrix.
- Sylvester's four point problem of geometric probability.
- The Sylvester expansion or Fibonacci–Sylvester expansion of a rational number, a representation as a sum of unit fractions found by a greedy algorithm.
- Sylvester's rank inequality rank(A) + rank(B) − n ≤ rank(AB) on the rank of the product of an m × n matrix A and an n × p matrix B.
- Sylver coinage, a number-theoretic game.
- Sylvester's bijection, a correspondence between partitions into distinct and odd parts.

== Other things named after Sylvester ==
- Sylvester (crater), an impact crater on the Moon
- Sylvester Medal, given by the Royal Society for the encouragement of mathematical research
- Sylvester (javascript library), a vector, matrix and geometry library for JavaScript

== See also ==
- Sylvester's closed solution for the Frobenius coin problem when there are only two coins.
- Sylvester's construction for an arbitrarily large Hadamard matrix.
- Scientific equations named after people
