= Kurt Schiffler =

Kurt Schiffler (6 April 1896 - 25 February 1986) was a German engineer, entrepreneur, inventor and amateur geometer.

Schiffler's father was an elementary school teacher and his grandfather was a toy manufacturer. Schiffler was born in Gotha, Thuringia, where he grew up as well. He had just completed the local gymnasium (high-school) in 1914, when he was drafted as a soldier in World War I. After the war Schiffler studied first at the Freiberg University of Mining and Technology and later at the University of Stuttgart, which awarded him an engineering degree. Then he worked as an engineer for a machine factory in Esslingen.

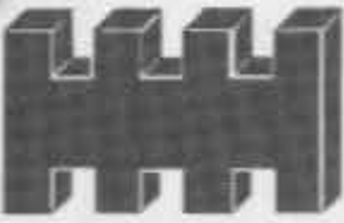
building block with cogs invented by Schiffler

In 1925 he founded his own company called Dusyma, which produced educational toys and musical instrument made of wood. The instruments that Dusyma produced comprised an improved version of the Stoessel lute and the Mandolute. In 1937 Schiffler invented a special building block with cogs as a basic element for construction kits of wood pieces allowing to construct various toy buildings and structures. Dusyma produced not only toys but also children's furniture and other supplies needed in kindergartens. Many of the educational toys Dusyma produced were inspired by the Froebel gifts. Schiffler collaborated with Erika Hoffman, a professor of pedagogics and expert on Friedrich Froebel, and the Kindergarten teacher Christine Uhl, who designed one of the construction kits produced by Dusyma.

During World War II Schiffler was again drafted as a soldier and his company was reorganized to produce material needed for the war effort. After the war Dusyma went back to manufacture educational toys and various kindergarten supplies. In addition to wood now plastic was used as construction material as well.

In 1971 Schiffler was awarded the Order of Merit of the Federal Republic of Germany. In 1978 he asked his daughter Lulu Schiffler-Betz to join Dusyma to prepare her for leading the company later on. 1981 Schiffler retired and passed on Dusyma's management to his daughter.

Triangle ABC is partitioned into triangles ABI, BCI, ACI and the Euler lines e_{0},e_{1},e_{2},e_{3} coincide in the Schiffler point S

Schiffler had in interest in geometry and discovered that if you partition a triangle into 3 subtriangle with the incenter as a common point, then the Euler lines of those subtriangles and the original triangle intersect in a common point. This property became later known as Schiffler's theorem and that common point as Schiffler point. Schiffler published his discovery in 1985 in the form of a problem in the Canadian journal Crux Mathematicorum.

Schiffler was married twice. From his first marriage he had one daughter and from his second marriage four daughters and one son.

== References and further reading ==
- Kurt Schiffler. In: Gitarre & Laute 7, 1985, Heft 5, p. 10, 12 (German)
- Lore Thier-Schröter und Hellmut Thier: Kurt Schiffler zum 100. Geburtstag. Gründer der Dusyma-Werkstätten. L. Schiffler-Betz, Schorndorf-Miedelsbach 1996 (German)
