= List of centroids =

The following is a list of centroids of various two-dimensional and three-dimensional objects. The centroid of an object $X$ in $n$-dimensional space is the intersection of all hyperplanes that divide $X$ into two parts of equal moment about the hyperplane. Informally, it is the "average" of all points of $X$. For an object of uniform composition, or in other words, has the same density at all points, the centroid of a body is also its center of mass. In the case of two-dimensional objects shown below, the hyperplanes are simply lines.

== 2-D Centroids ==
For each two-dimensional shape below, the area and the centroid coordinates $(\bar{x},\bar{y})$ are given:

Shape	Figure	$\bar x$	$\bar y$	Area
rectangle area		$\frac{b}{2}$	$\frac{h}{2}$	${bh}$
General triangular area		$\frac{x_1+x_2+x_3}{3}$	$\frac{h}{3}$	$\frac{bh}{2}$
Isosceles-triangular area		$\frac{l}{2}$	$\frac{h}{3}$	$\frac{lh}{2}$
Right-triangular area		$\frac{b}{3}$	$\frac{h}{3}$	$\frac{bh}{2}$
Circular area		$0$	$0$	${\pi r^2}$
Quarter-circular area		$\frac{4r}{3\pi}$	$\frac{4r}{3\pi}$	$\frac{\pi r^2}{4}$
Semicircular area		$0$	$\frac{4r}{3\pi}$	$\frac{\pi r^2}{2}$
Circular sector		$\frac{2r\sin(\alpha)}{3\alpha}$	$\,\!0$	$\,\!\alpha r^2$
Circular segment		$\frac{4r\sin^3(\alpha)}{3(2\alpha-\sin(2\alpha))}$	$\,\!0$	$\frac{r^2}{2}(2\alpha -\sin(2\alpha))$
Annular sector		$\frac{2\sin(\alpha)}{3 \alpha} \frac{r_2^3-r_1^3}{r_2^2-r_1^2}$	$\,\!0$	$\alpha (r_2^2-r_1^2)$
Quarter-circular arc	The points on the circle $\,\!x^2 + y^2 = r^2$ and in the first quadrant	$\frac{2r}{\pi}$	$\frac{2r}{\pi}$	$L=\frac{\pi r}{2}$
Semicircular arc	The points on the circle $\,\!x^2 + y^2 = r^2$ and above the $\,\!x$ axis	$\,\!0$	$\frac{2r}{\pi}$	$L=\,\!\pi r$
Arc of circle	The points on the curve (in polar coordinates) $\,\!\rho = r$, from $\,\!\theta = -\alpha$ to $\,\!\theta = \alpha$	$\frac{\rho\sin(\alpha)}{\alpha}$	$\,\!0$	$L=\,\!2\alpha \rho$
elliptical area		$0$	$0$	${\pi a b}$
Quarter-elliptical area		$\frac{4a}{3\pi}$	$\frac{4b}{3\pi}$	$\frac{\pi a b}{4}$
Semielliptical area		$\,\!0$	$\frac{4b}{3\pi}$	$\frac{\pi a b}{2}$
Parabolic area	The area between the curve $\,\!y = \frac{h}{b^2} x^2$ and the line $\,\!y = h$	$\,\!0$	$\frac{3h}{5}$	$\frac{4bh}{3}$
Semiparabolic area The area between the curve $y = \frac{h}{b^2} x^2$ and the $\,\!y$ axis, from $\,\!y = 0$ to $\,\!y = h$		$\frac{3b}{8}$	$\frac{3h}{5}$	$\frac{2bh}{3}$
Parabolic spandrel	The area between the curve $\,\!y = \frac{h}{b^2} x^2$ and the $\,\!x$ axis, from $\,\!x = 0$ to $\,\!x = b$	$\frac{3b}{4}$	$\frac{3h}{10}$	$\frac{bh}{3}$
General spandrel	The area between the curve $y = \frac{h}{b^n} x^n$ and the $\,\!x$ axis, from $\,\!x = 0$ to $\,\!x = b$	$\frac{n + 1}{n + 2} b$	$\frac{n + 1}{4n + 2} h$	$\frac{bh}{n + 1}$

- Where the centroid coordinates are marked as zero, the coordinates are at the origin, and the equations to get those points are the lengths of the included axes divided by two, in order to reach the center which in these cases are the origin and thus zero.

== 3-D Centroids ==
For each three-dimensional body below, the volume and the centroid coordinates $(\bar{x},\bar{y},\bar{z})$ are given:

Shape	Figure	$\bar x$	$\bar y$	$\bar z$	Volume
Cuboid	a, b = the sides of the cuboid's base c = the third side of the cuboid	$\frac{a}{2}$	$\frac{b}{2}$	$\frac{c}{2}$	${abc}$
Right-rectangular pyramid	a, b = the sides of the base h = the distance is from base to the apex	$\frac{a}{2}$	$\frac{b}{2}$	$\frac{h}{4}$	$\frac{abh}{3}$
General triangular prism	b = the base side of the prism's triangular base, h = the height of the prism's triangular base L = the length of the prism	see above for general triangular base	$\frac{h}{3}$	$\frac{L}{2}$	$\frac{bhL}{2}$
Isosceles triangular prism	b = the base side of the prism's triangular base, h = the height of the prism's triangular base L = the length of the prism	$\frac{b}{2}$	$\frac{h}{3}$	$\frac{L}{2}$	$\frac{bhL}{2}$
Right-triangular prism	b = the base side of the prism's triangular base, h = the perpendicular side of the prism's triangular base L = the length of the prism	$\frac{b}{3}$	$\frac{h}{3}$	$\frac{L}{2}$	$\frac{bhL}{2}$
Right circular cylinder	r = the radius of the cylinder h = the height of the cylinder	$0$	$0$	$\frac{h}{2}$	${\pi r^2h}$
Right circular solid cone	r = the radius of the cone's base h = the distance is from base to the apex	$0$	$0$	$\frac{h}{4}$	$\frac{\pi r^2 h}{3}$
Solid sphere	r = the radius of the sphere	$0$	$0$	$0$	$\frac{4 \pi r^3}{3}$
Solid hemisphere	r = the radius of the hemisphere	$0$	$0$	$\frac{3 r}{8}$	$\frac{2 \pi r^3}{3}$
Solid semi-ellipsoid of revolution around z-axis	a = the radius of the base circle h = the height of the semi-ellipsoid from the base cicle's center to the edge	$0$	$0$	$\frac{3 h}{8}$	$\frac{2 \pi a^2 h}{3}$
Solid paraboloid of revolution around z-axis	a = the radius of the base circle h = the height of the paboloid from the base cicle's center to the edge	$0$	$0$	$\frac{h}{3}$	$\frac{\pi a^2 h}{2}$
Solid ellipsoid	a, b, c = the principal semi-axes of the ellipsoid	$0$	$0$	$0$	$\frac{4 \pi a b c}{3}$
Solid semi-ellipsoid around z-axis	a, b = the principal semi-axes of the base ellipse c = the principal z-semi-axe from the center of base ellipse	$0$	$0$	$\frac{3 c}{8}$	$\frac{2 \pi a b c}{3}$
Solid paraboloid around z-axis	a, b = the principal semi-axes of the base ellipse c = the principal z-semi-axe from the center of base ellipse	$0$	$0$	$\frac{c}{3}$	$\frac{\pi a b c}{2}$

== See also ==
- List of moments of inertia
- List of second moments of area
