= James Joseph Sylvester =

English mathematician (1814–1897)

Professor James Joseph Sylvester FRS HonFRSE
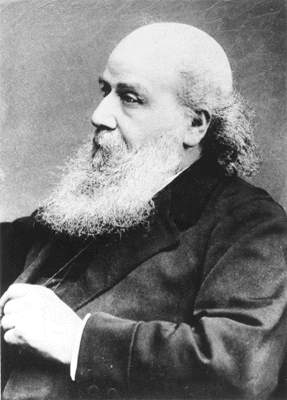
- Born: James Joseph; 3 September 1814; London, England
- Died: 15 March 1897 (aged 82); London, England
- Resting place: Balls Pond Road Cemetery
- Education: St. John's College, Cambridge
- Known for: Coining the terms 'graph' and 'discriminant'; Chebyshev–Sylvester constant; Quadruplanar inversor; Sylvester's sequence; Sylvester's formula; Sylvester's determinant theorem; Sylvester matrix; Sylvester–Gallai theorem; Sylvester's law of inertia; Sylvester's triangle problem; Sylver coinage; Sylvester's criterion; Sylvester domain
- Awards: Royal Medal (1861); Copley Medal (1880); De Morgan Medal (1887)
- Scientific career
- Fields: Mathematics
- Workplaces: Johns Hopkins University; University College London; University of Virginia; Royal Military Academy, Woolwich; University of Oxford
- Academic advisors: John Hymers; Augustus De Morgan
- Doctoral students: William Durfee; George B. Halsted; Washington Irving Stringham
- Other notable students: Isaac Todhunter; William Roberts McDaniel; Harry Fielding Reid; Christine Ladd-Franklin

James Joseph Sylvester (3 September 1814 – 15 March 1897) was an English mathematician. He made fundamental contributions to matrix theory, invariant theory, number theory, partition theory, and combinatorics. He played a leadership role in American mathematics in the later half of the 19th century as a professor at the Johns Hopkins University and as founder of the American Journal of Mathematics. At his death, he was a professor at Oxford University.

== Early life, family and education ==
James Joseph was born in London on 3 September 1814, the son of Abraham Joseph, a Jewish merchant. James later adopted the surname Sylvester when his older brother did so upon emigration to the US. At age 14, Sylvester was a student of Augustus De Morgan at the University of London (now University College London). His family withdrew him from the university after he was accused of stabbing a fellow student with a knife. Subsequently, he attended the Liverpool Royal Institution.

Sylvester began his study of mathematics at St John's College, Cambridge in 1831, where his tutor was John Hymers. Although his studies were interrupted for almost two years due to a prolonged illness, he nevertheless ranked second in Cambridge's famous mathematical examination, the tripos, for which he sat in 1837. However, Sylvester was not issued a degree, because graduates at that time were required to state their acceptance of the Thirty-nine Articles of the Church of England, and he could not do so because he was Jewish. For the same reason, he was unable to compete for a Fellowship or obtain a Smith's prize. In 1838, Sylvester became professor of natural philosophy at University College London and in 1839 a Fellow of the Royal Society of London. In 1841, he was awarded a BA and an MA by Trinity College Dublin.

== Career ==
In 1841, Sylvester moved to the US to become a professor of mathematics at the University of Virginia, the first Jewish professor at any American college or university. He left his appointment after only four months after a classroom incident in which a student he had criticized hit him with a bludgeon and he struck back with a sword-cane. The student collapsed in shock and Sylvester believed (wrongly) that he had killed him. Sylvester resigned when he felt that the university authorities had not sufficiently disciplined the student. He moved to New York City and began friendships with the Harvard mathematician Benjamin Peirce (Note: Father of mathematician and philosopher Charles Sanders Peirce) and the Princeton physicist Joseph Henry. However, he left in November 1843 after being denied appointment as Professor of Mathematics at Columbia College (now University), again for his Judaism, and returned to England.

In England, he was hired in 1844 by the Equity and Law Life Assurance Society for which he developed successful actuarial models and served as de facto CEO, a position that required a law degree. As a result, he studied for the Bar, meeting a fellow British mathematician studying law, Arthur Cayley, with whom he made significant contributions to invariant theory and also matrix theory during a long collaboration. He did not obtain a position teaching university mathematics until 1855, when he was appointed professor of mathematics at the Royal Military Academy, Woolwich, from which he retired in 1869, because the compulsory retirement age was 55. The Woolwich academy initially refused to pay Sylvester his full pension, and only relented after a prolonged public controversy, during which Sylvester took his case to the letters page of The Times.

In 1876, Sylvester returned to the US to become the inaugural professor of mathematics at the new Johns Hopkins University in Baltimore, Maryland. His salary was $5,000 (quite generous for the time), which he demanded be paid in gold, but after further negotiation, it was not.

Sylvester founded the American Journal of Mathematics in 1878. The only other mathematical journal in the US at that time was The Analyst, which eventually became the Annals of Mathematics. Also in 1878, Christine Ladd-Franklin was accepted into Johns Hopkins University with his help. He remembered some of Ladd's earlier works in the Educational Times. Ladd's application for a fellowship was signed "C. Ladd", and the university offered her the position without realizing she was a woman. When they did realise her gender, the board tried to revoke the offer, but Sylvester insisted that Ladd should be his student, and so she was. She held a fellowship at Johns Hopkins University for three years, but the trustees did not allow her name to be printed in circulars with those of other fellows, for fear of setting a precedent. Furthermore, dissension over her continued presence forced one of the original trustees to resign.

In 1883, Sylvester returned to England to take up the position of Savilian Professor of Geometry at Oxford University. He held this chair until his death, although in 1892 the university appointed a deputy professor to the same chair. He was on the governing body of Abingdon School.

=== Concepts and terminology coined ===
Sylvester introduced a number of mathematical terms that remain in use. He coined the word "matrix" in 1850, the term "graph" in the sense of network, and the term "discriminant". He also introduced the word "totient" for Euler's totient function φ(n).

In discrete geometry, he is remembered for Sylvester's problem and a result on the orchard problem, and in matrix theory he discovered Sylvester's determinant identity, which generalizes the Desnanot–Jacobi identity. His collected scientific work fills four volumes.

== Honors and awards ==
In 1861, Sylvester was elected an honorary member of the Manchester Literary and Philosophical Society and in 1872, he finally received his B.A. and M.A. from Cambridge, having been denied the degrees due to his being a Jew. In 1877, he was elected as a member to the American Philosophical Society. In 1880, the Royal Society of London awarded Sylvester the Copley Medal, its highest award for scientific achievement.

== Personal life and demise ==
Sylvester never married and is not known to have had any children; biographical sources do not record any romantic relationships. Throughout his career, he formed lasting friendships with leading scientific figures. In New York he became close to the mathematician Benjamin Peirce and the physicist Joseph Henry, and in England he developed a long and productive friendship with Arthur Cayley, with whom he shared both personal ties and major mathematical collaborations.

One of Sylvester's lifelong passions was for poetry; he read and translated works from the original French, German, Italian, Latin and Greek, and many of his mathematical papers contain illustrative quotes from classical poetry. Following his early retirement, Sylvester published The Laws of Verse, a book in which he attempted to codify a set of laws for prosody in poetry.

Sylvester died at 5 Hertford Street, London on 15 March 1897. He is buried in Balls Pond Road Cemetery on Kingsbury Road in London.

== Legacy ==
In 1901, the Royal Society of London instituted the Sylvester Medal in his memory, to encourage mathematical research after his death in Oxford.

Sylvester House, a portion of an undergraduate dormitory at Johns Hopkins University, is named in his honour. Several professorships there are named in his honour also.

== Publications ==
- Sylvester, James Joseph (1870). The Laws of Verse, or, Principles of Versification Exemplified in Metrical Translations: Together with an Annotated Reprint of the Inaugural Presidential Address to the Mathematical and Physical Section of the British Association at Exeter. London: Longmans, Green and Co.
- Sylvester, James Joseph (1973) [1904]. Baker, Henry Frederick (ed.). The Collected Mathematical Papers of James Joseph Sylvester. Vol. I. New York: AMS Chelsea Publishing. ISBN 978-0-8218-3654-5.
- Sylvester, James Joseph (1973) [1908]. Baker, Henry Frederick (ed.). The Collected Mathematical Papers of James Joseph Sylvester. Vol. II. New York: AMS Chelsea Publishing. ISBN 978-0-8218-4719-0.
- Sylvester, James Joseph (1973) [1904]. Baker, Henry Frederick (ed.). The Collected Mathematical Papers of James Joseph Sylvester. Vol. III. New York: AMS Chelsea Publishing. ISBN 978-0-8218-4720-6.
- Sylvester, James Joseph (1973) [1904]. Baker, Henry Frederick (ed.). The Collected Mathematical Papers of James Joseph Sylvester. Vol. IV. New York: AMS Chelsea Publishing. ISBN 978-0-8218-4238-6.

His collected scientific work fills four volumes.

== See also ==
- Catalecticant
- Clock and shift matrices
- Covariance and contravariance of vectors
- Evectant
- Inclusion–exclusion principle
- Invariant of a binary form
- Sylvester's construction
- Sylvester pentahedron
- Sylvester's problem
- Umbral calculus
- List of things named after James Joseph Sylvester
