= Trifolium curve =

Type of quartic plane curve

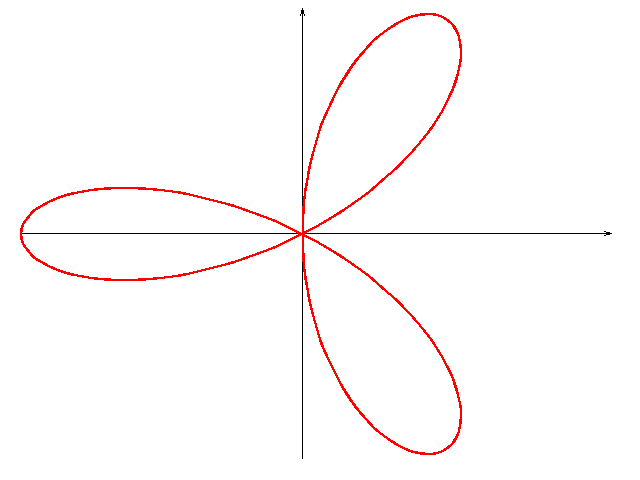
This image shows a trifolium curve using its Cartesian equation.

The trifolium curve (also three-leafed clover curve, 3-petaled rose curve, and pâquerette de mélibée) is a type of quartic plane curve. The name comes from the Latin terms for 3-leaved, defining itself as a folium shape with 3 equally sized leaves.

It is described as

$$x^4+2x^2y^2+y^4-x^3+3xy^2=0. \,$$

By solving for y by substituting y^{2} and its square, the curve can be described by the following function(s):

$$y=\pm\sqrt{\frac{-2x^2-3x\pm\sqrt{16x^3+9x^2}}{2}},\,\,y^2=\frac{-x(2x+3)\pm x\sqrt{16x+9}}{2}$$

Due to the separate ± symbols, it is possible to solve for 4 different answers at a given (positive) x-coordinate; 2 y-values per negative x-coordinate. One sees 2 resp. 1 pair(s) of solutions, mirroring points on the curve.

It has a polar equation of

This image shows the trifolium curve using its polar equation. Its area is equivalent to one quarter the area of the inscribed circle.

$r=-a\cos(3\theta)$

and a Cartesian equation of

$$(x^2+y^2)[y^2+x(x+a)] = 4axy^2.$$

The area of the trifolium shape is defined by the following equation:

$A=\frac{1}{2} a^2 \int_{0}^{\pi}\cos^2(3\theta) \, d\theta\,$ $=\frac{\pi a^2}{4}$

And it has a length of

$6a\int_{0}^{\tfrac{\pi}{2}} \sqrt{1-\frac{8}{9}\sin^2t}\, dt\thickapprox6.7 a$

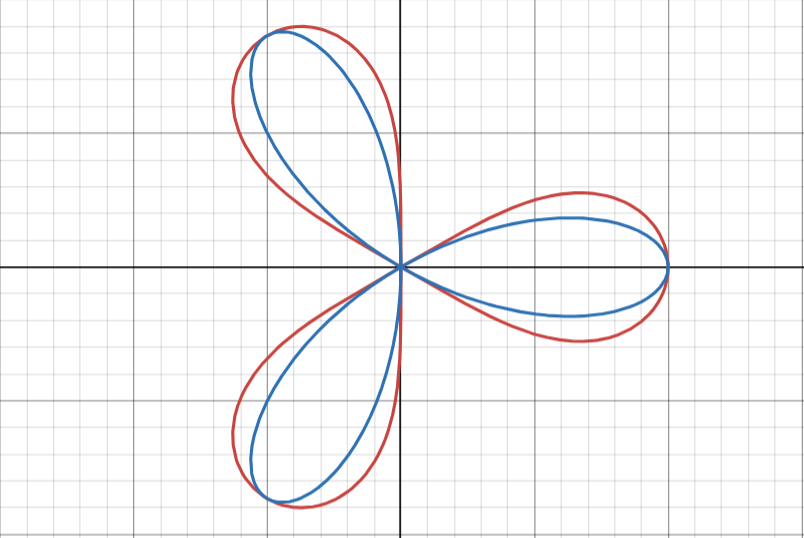
This image shows two equations for the trifolium defined as $x^4+2x^2y^2+y^4-x^3+3xy^2=0$ (blue) and $(x^2+y^2)^3-x(x^2-3y^2)=0$ (red).

The trifolium was described by J.D. Lawrence as a form of Kepler's folium when

$b \in (0, 4, a)$

A more present definition is when $a=b.$

The trifolium was described by Dana-Picard as

$(x^2+y^2)^3-x(x^2-3y^2)=0$

He defines the trifolium as having three leaves and having a triple point at the origin made up of 4 arcs. The trifolium is a sextic curve meaning that any line through the origin will have it pass through the curve again and through its complex conjugate twice.

The trifolium is a type of rose curve when $k = 3$

Gaston Albert Gohierre de Longchamps was the first to study the trifolium, and it was given the name Torpille because of its resemblance to fish.

The trifolium was later studied and given its name by Henry Cundy and Arthur Rollett.

== See also ==
- Trefoil knot in topology
- Folium of Descartes
- Bifolium
