= IC 708 =

Radio galaxy in the constellation of Ursa Major

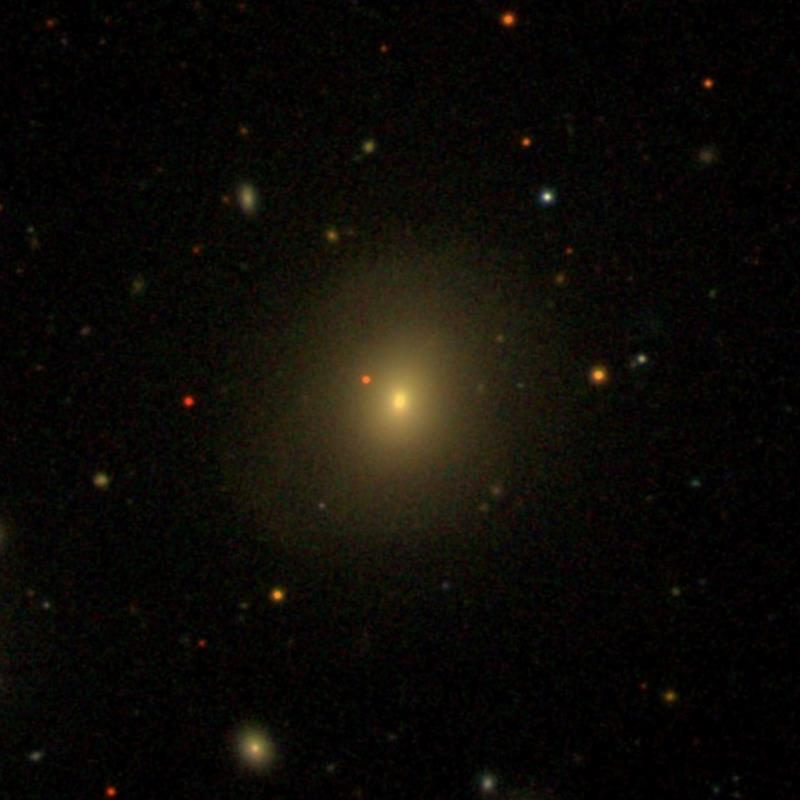
- The elliptical galaxy IC 708

Observation data (J2000 epoch)
- Constellation: Ursa Major
- Right ascension: 11^{h} 33^{m} 59.21^{s}
- Declination: +49° 03′ 43.43″
- Redshift: 0.031647
- Heliocentric radial velocity: 9,487 km/s ± 2
- Distance: 456 Mly
- Group or cluster: Abell 1314
- Apparent magnitude (V): 13.0

Characteristics
- Type: E
- Size: ~160,200 ly (49.12 kpc) (estimated)

Other designations
- UGC 6549, MCG +08-21-056, NFGS 086, PGC 35720, Papillon, WBL 339-001, CGCG 242-048

IC 708, also known as the Papillon Galaxy, is an elliptical galaxy in the constellation of Ursa Major. The redshift of the galaxy is (z) 0.031 and it was first discovered on May 11, 1890, by an American astronomer named Lewis Swift, who found it to be faint, small and also a round object. It is a member of the galaxy cluster, Abell 1314, which also includes the members IC 709, IC 711, and IC 712.

== Description ==
IC 708 is categorized as a wide-angle tail (WAT) radio galaxy, although some studies have also categorized it to be a head-tail radio galaxy in addition. It contains twin jets displaying multiple knot features that terminate at the position of two radio lobes located at the south and north direction. There is also a nuclear radio component present in the source.

A study published in 1981, has found the radio structure of IC 708 has a double hooked morphology based on Very Large Array (VLA) imaging. It has two trails of radio emission that flare outwards into a form of diffused emission wings located 35 kiloparsecs away from its main optical position. This suggests the galaxy is gravitationally interacting with IC 709. The E-vector position angle of linear polarization has a rough alignment towards the jet from the core position right up to around 1.8 kiloparsecs, with the polarized intensity declining 0.3 mJy per the beam area. From the core towards the jet's axis, the linear polarization percentage rises from 1% to 10%.
