= Bifolium (disambiguation) =

A bifolium is a type of mathematical curve. It can also refer to:

== Animals ==
- A genus of brachiopods

== Plants ==
- Orchid genera now considered synonyms of Neottia
  - Bifolium Petiver ex Nieuwland
  - Bifolium P. G. Gaertner, B. Meyer et J. Scherbius
- Bifolium cordatum, a synonym of Maianthemum bifolium
- A taxonomic section of the genus Larrea

== Manuscripts ==
- A single sheet of parchment constituting two folios
