= Gossard perspector =

Triangle geometry term

In geometry the Gossard perspector (also called the Zeeman–Gossard perspector) is a special point associated with a plane triangle. It is a triangle center and it is designated as X(402) in Clark Kimberling's Encyclopedia of Triangle Centers. The point was named Gossard perspector by John Conway in 1998 in honour of Harry Clinton Gossard who discovered its existence in 1916. Later it was learned that the point had appeared in an article by Christopher Zeeman published during 1899 – 1902. From 2003 onwards the Encyclopedia of Triangle Centers has been referring to this point as Zeeman–Gossard perspector.

== Definition ==
H, H_{A}, H_{B}, H_{C}, H_{g} are orthocenters, and G, G_{A}, G_{B}, G_{C}, G_{g} are centroids of triangles ABC, AEF, BFD, CDE, A_{g}B_{g}C_{g} respectively.

=== Gossard triangle ===
Let ABC be any triangle. Let the Euler line of triangle ABC meet the sidelines BC, CA and AB of triangle ABC at D, E and F respectively. Let A_{g}B_{g}C_{g} be the triangle formed by the Euler lines of the triangles AEF, BFD and CDE, the vertex A_{g} being the intersection of the Euler lines of the triangles BFD and CDE, and similarly for the other two vertices. The triangle A_{g}B_{g}C_{g} is called the Gossard triangle of triangle ABC.

=== Gossard perspector ===
Let ABC be any triangle and let A_{g}B_{g}C_{g} be its Gossard triangle. Then the lines AA_{g}, BB_{g} and CC_{g} are concurrent. The point of concurrence is called the Gossard perspector of triangle ABC.

== Properties ==
- Let A_{g}B_{g}C_{g} be the Gossard triangle of triangle ABC. The lines B_{g}C_{g}, C_{g}A_{g} and A_{g}B_{g} are respectively parallel to the lines BC, CA and AB.
- Any triangle and its Gossard triangle are congruent.
- Any triangle and its Gossard triangle have the same Euler line.
- The Gossard triangle of triangle ABC is the reflection of triangle ABC in the Gossard perspector.

=== Trilinear coordinates ===
The trilinear coordinates of the Gossard perspector of triangle ABC are

( f ( a, b, c ) : f ( b, c, a ) : f ( c, a, b ) )

where

f ( a, b, c ) = p ( a, b, c ) y ( a, b, c ) / a

where

p ( a, b, c ) = 2a^{4} − a^{2}b^{2} − a^{2}c^{2} − ( b^{2} − c^{2} )^{2}

and

y ( a, b, c ) = a^{8} − a^{6} ( b^{2} + c^{2} ) + a^{4} ( 2b^{2} − c^{2} ) ( 2c^{2} − b^{2} ) + ( b^{2} − c^{2} )^{2} [ 3a^{2} ( b^{2} + c^{2} ) − b^{4} − c^{4} − 3b^{2}c^{2} ]

In the figure, DEF is the Euler line of triangle ABC. The line XYZ moves parallel to the line DEF. The triangle A'B'C' remains congruent to triangle ABC whatever be the position of the line XYZ. The blue 'inverted' triangle is the Gossard triangle of triangle ABC.

== Generalizations ==
The construction yielding the Gossard triangle of a triangle ABC can be generalised to produce triangles A'B'C' which are congruent to triangle ABC and whose sidelines are parallel to the sidelines of triangle ABC.

=== Zeeman’s Generalization ===
This result is due to Christopher Zeeman.

Let l be any line parallel to the Euler line of triangle ABC. Let l intersect the sidelines BC, CA, AB of triangle ABC at X, Y, Z respectively. Let A'B'C' be the triangle formed by the Euler lines of the triangles AYZ, BZX and CXY. Then triangle A'B'C' is congruent to triangle ABC and its sidelines are parallel to the sidelines of triangle ABC.

=== Yiu’s Generalization ===
Paul Yiu's generalisation of Gossard triangle.

This generalisation is due to Paul Yiu.

Let P be any point in the plane of the triangle ABC different from its centroid G.

Let the line PG meet the sidelines BC, CA and AB at X, Y and Z respectively.
Let the centroids of the triangles AYZ, BZX and CXY be G_{a}, G_{b} and G_{c} respectively.
Let P_{a} be a point such that YP_{a} is parallel to CP and ZP_{a} is parallel to BP.
Let P_{b} be a point such that ZP_{b} is parallel to AP and XP_{b} is parallel to CP.
Let P_{c} be a point such that XP_{c} is parallel to BP and YP_{c} is parallel to AP.
Let A'B'C' be the triangle formed by the lines G_{a}P_{a}, G_{b}P_{b} and G_{c}P_{c}.

Then the triangle A'B'C' is congruent to triangle ABC and its sides are parallel to the sides of triangle ABC.

When P coincides with the orthocenter H of triangle ABC then the line PG coincides with the Euler line of triangle ABC. The triangle A'B'C' coincides with the Gossard triangle A_{g}B_{g}C_{g} of triangle ABC.

=== Dao's Generalisation ===
The theorem was further generalized by Dao Thanh Oai. Let ABC be a triangle. Let H and O be two points in the plane, and let the line HO meets BC, CA, AB at A_{0}, B_{0}, C_{0} respectively. Let A_{H} and A_{O} be two points such that C_{0}A_{H} parallel to BH, B_{0}A_{H} parallel to CH and C_{0}A_{O} parallel to BO, B_{0}A_{O} parallel to CO. Define B_{H}, B_{O}, C_{H}, C_{O} cyclically. Then the triangle formed by the lines A_{H}A_{O}, B_{H}B_{O}, C_{H}C_{O} and triangle ABC are homothetic and congruent, and the homothetic center lies on the line OH. Dao Thanh Oai's result is generalization of all results above.

- When HO is the Euler line, Dao's result is the Gossard perspector theorem.
- When PQ parallel to the Euler line, Dao's result is the Zeeman's generalization.
- When P is the centroid, Dao's result is the Yiu's generalization.

The homothetic center in Encyclopedia of Triangle Centers named Dao-Zeeman perspector of the line OH.

== See also ==
- Central line
- Encyclopedia of Triangle Centers
- Triangle centroid
- Central triangle
- Euler line
