= Exeter point =

Triangle center

In geometry, the Exeter point is a special point associated with a plane triangle. It is a triangle center and is designated as X(22) in Clark Kimberling's Encyclopedia of Triangle Centers. This was discovered in a computers-in-mathematics workshop at Phillips Exeter Academy in 1986. This is one of the recent triangle centers, unlike the classical triangle centers like centroid, incenter, and Steiner point.

== Definition ==
Reference triangle △ABC Medians (concur at centroid) Circumcircle Triangle △A'B'C' formed by intersection of medians with circumcircle Tangential triangle △DEF Lines joining vertices of △DEF and △A'B'C' (concur at Exeter point)

The Exeter point is defined as follows.

- Let △ABC be any given triangle.
- Let the medians through the vertices A, B, C meet the circumcircle of △ABC at A', B', C' respectively.
- Let △DEF be the triangle formed by the tangents at A, B, C to the circumcircle of △ABC. (Let D be the vertex opposite to the side formed by the tangent at the vertex A, E be the vertex opposite to the side formed by the tangent at the vertex B, and F be the vertex opposite to the side formed by the tangent at the vertex C.)
- The lines through DA', EB', FC' are concurrent. The point of concurrence is the Exeter point of △ABC.

Put succinctly, the Exeter point is the perspector of the circummedial triangle and the tangential triangle.

== Trilinear coordinates ==
The trilinear coordinates of the Exeter point are

$$a(b^4 + c^4 - a^4) : b(c^4 + a^4 - b^4) : c(a^4 + b^4 - c^4)$$

== Properties ==
- The Exeter point of triangle ABC lies on the Euler line (the line passing through the centroid, the orthocenter, the de Longchamps point, the Euler centre and the circumcenter) of triangle ABC. So there are 6 points collinear on a single line.
