= Center-of-gravity method =

The center-of-gravity method is a theoretic algorithm for convex optimization. It can be seen as a generalization of the bisection method from one-dimensional functions to multi-dimensional functions. It is theoretically important as it attains the optimal convergence rate. However, it has little practical value as each step is very computationally expensive.

== Input ==
Our goal is to solve a convex optimization problem of the form:

minimize f(x) s.t. x in G,

where f is a convex function, and G is a convex subset of a Euclidean space R^{n}.

We assume that we have a "subgradient oracle": a routine that can compute a subgradient of f at any given point (if f is differentiable, then the only subgradient is the gradient $\nabla f$; but we do not assume that f is differentiable).

== Method ==
The method is iterative. At each iteration t, we keep a convex region G_{t}, which surely contains the desired minimum. Initially we have G_{0} = G. Then, each iteration t proceeds as follows.

- Let x_{t} be the center of gravity of G_{t}.
- Compute a subgradient at x_{t}, denoted f'(x_{t}).
  - By definition of a subgradient, the graph of f is above the subgradient, so for all x in G_{t}: f(x)−f(x_{t}) ≥ (x−x_{t})^{T}f'(x_{t}).
- If f'(x_{t})=0, then the above implies that x_{t} is an exact minimum point, so we terminate and return x_{t.}
- Otherwise, let G_{t}_{+1} := {x in G_{t}: (x−x_{t})^{T}f'(x_{t}) ≤ 0}.

Note that, by the above inequality, every minimum point of f must be in G_{t}_{+1.}

== Convergence ==
It can be proved that

$Volume(G_{t+1})\leq \left[1-\left(\frac{n}{n+1}\right)^n\right]\cdot Volume(G_t)$ .

Therefore,

$f(x_t) - \min_G f \leq \left[1-\left(\frac{n}{n+1}\right)^n\right]^{t/n} [\max_G f - \min_G f]$.

In other words, the method has linear convergence of the residual objective value, with convergence rate $\left[1-\left(\frac{n}{n+1}\right)^n\right]^{1/n} \leq (1-1/e)^{1/n}$. To get an ε-approximation to the objective value, the number of required steps is at most $2.13 n \ln(1/\epsilon) + 1$.

== Computational complexity ==
The main problem with the method is that, in each step, we have to compute the center-of-gravity of a polytope. All the methods known so far for this problem require a number of arithmetic operations that is exponential in the dimension n. Therefore, the method is not useful in practice when there are 5 or more dimensions.

== See also ==
The ellipsoid method can be seen as a tractable approximation to the center-of-gravity method. Instead of maintaining the feasible polytope G_{t}, it maintains an ellipsoid that contains it. Computing the center-of-gravity of an ellipsoid is much easier than of a general polytope, and hence the ellipsoid method can usually be computed in polynomial time.
