= Harry Clinton Gossard =

American mathematician

Diagram of Gossard perspector

Harry Clinton Gossard (1884–1954) was an American educator and geometer. He is credited with the discovery of a then unknown triangle center in 1916 to which John Conway assigned the name Gossard perspector in 1998.

After receiving his Ph.D. from Johns Hopkins University in 1912, Gossard taught at University of Oklahoma (1912–1916), the U. S. Naval Academy (1916–18), University of Oklahoma (1918–19), University of Wyoming (1921–25), and Nebraska Wesleyan University (1926–31). During the period 1931 to 1939, Gossard was president of New Mexico Normal University (now New Mexico Highlands University), and during 1939 to 1950, he was dean of Eastern New Mexico College (now Eastern New Mexico University). He worked for the US State Department during the last four years of his life.
