= Circumcenter of mass =

Type of center of a polygon

In geometry, the circumcenter of mass is a center associated with a polygon which shares many of the properties of the center of mass. More generally, the circumcenter of mass may be defined for simplicial polytopes and also in the spherical and hyperbolic geometries.

In the special case when the polytope is a quadrilateral or hexagon, the circumcenter of mass has been called the "quasicircumcenter" and has been used to define an Euler line of a quadrilateral. The circumcenter of mass allows us to define an Euler line for simplicial polytopes.

== Definition in the plane ==
Let $P$ be an oriented polygon (with vertices counted countercyclically) in the plane with vertices $V_1,V_2,\ldots,V_n$ and let $O$ be an arbitrary point not lying on the sides (or their extensions). Consider the triangulation of $P$ by the oriented triangles $O V_i V_{i+1}$ (the index $i$ is viewed modulo $n$). Associate with each of these triangles its circumcenter $C_i$ with weight equal to its oriented area (positive if its sequence of vertices is countercyclical; negative otherwise). The circumcenter of mass of $P$ is the center of mass of these weighted circumcenters. The result is independent of the choice of point $O$.

Circumcenter of mass of a polygon.

== Properties ==
In the special case when the polygon is cyclic, the circumcenter of mass coincides with the circumcenter.

The circumcenter of mass satisfies an analog of Archimedes' Lemma, which states that if a polygon is decomposed into two smaller polygons, then the circumcenter of mass of that polygon is a weighted sum of the circumcenters of mass of the two smaller polygons. As a consequence, any triangulation with nondegenerate triangles may be used to define the circumcenter of mass.

For an equilateral polygon, the circumcenter of mass and center of mass coincide. More generally, the circumcenter of mass and center of mass coincide for a simplicial polytope for which each face has the sum of squares of its edges a constant.

The circumcenter of mass is invariant under the operation of "recutting" of polygons and the discrete bicycle (Darboux) transformation; in other words, the image of a polygon under these operations has the same circumcenter of mass as the original polygon. The generalized Euler line makes other appearances in the theory of integrable systems.

Let $V_i=(x_i,y_i)$ be the vertices of $P$ and let $A$ denote its area. The circumcenter of mass $CCM(P)$ of the polygon $P$ is given by the formula

$$CCM(P)=\frac{1}{4 A}(\sum_{i=0}^{n-1} -y_i y_{i+1}^2+y_i^2 y_{i+1} +x_i^2 y_{i+1}-x_{i+1}^2 y_i, \sum_{i=0}^{n-1} -x_{i+1} y_i^2+x_i y_{i+1}^2+x_i x_{i+1}^2-x_i^2 x_{i+1}).$$

The circumcenter of mass can be extended to smooth curves via a limiting procedure. This continuous limit coincides with the center of mass of the homogeneous lamina bounded by the curve.

Under natural assumptions, the centers of polygons which satisfy Archimedes' Lemma are precisely the points of its Euler line. In other words, the only "well-behaved" centers which satisfy Archimedes' Lemma are the affine combinations of the circumcenter of mass and center of mass.

== Generalized Euler line ==
The circumcenter of mass allows an Euler line to be defined for any polygon (and more generally, for a simplicial polytope). This generalized Euler line is defined as the affine span of the center of mass and circumcenter of mass of the polytope.

== See also ==
- Circumcenter
- Circumscribed sphere
