= Schiffler point =

Point defined as a triangle center

Diagram of the Schiffler point Triangle △ABC Angle bisectors; concur at incenter I Lines joining the midpoints of each angle bisector to the vertices of △ABC Lines perpendicular to each angle bisector at their midpoints Euler lines; concur at the Schiffler point Sp

In geometry, the Schiffler point of a triangle is a triangle center, a point defined from the triangle that is equivariant under Euclidean transformations of the triangle. This point was first defined and investigated by Schiffler et al. (1985).

== Definition ==
A triangle △ABC with the incenter I has its Schiffler point at the point of concurrence of the Euler lines of the four triangles △BCI, △CAI, △ABI, △ABC. Schiffler's theorem states that these four lines all meet at a single point.

== Coordinates ==
Trilinear coordinates for the Schiffler point are

$\frac{1}{\cos B + \cos C} : \frac{1}{\cos C + \cos A} : \frac{1}{\cos A + \cos B}$

or, equivalently,

$$\frac{b+c-a}{b+c} : \frac{c+a-b}{c+a} : \frac{a+b-c}{a+b}$$

where a, b, c denote the side lengths of triangle △ABC.
