= IC 711 =

Galaxy in the constellation Ursa Major

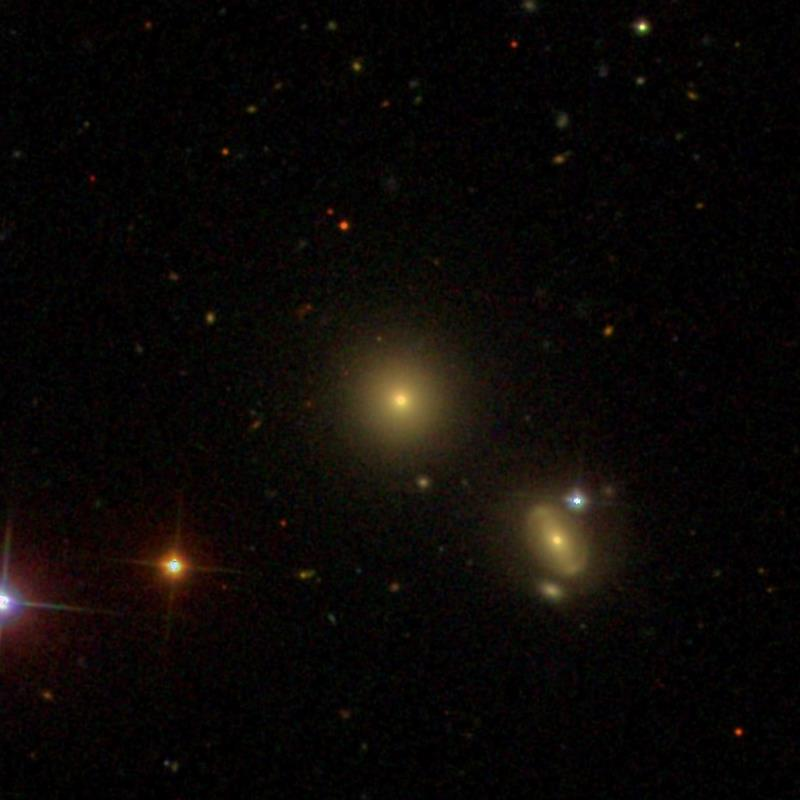
- The elliptical galaxy IC 711

Observation data (J2000 epoch)
- Constellation: Ursa Major
- Right ascension: 11^{h} 34^{m} 46.55^{s}
- Declination: +48° 57′ 21.93″
- Redshift: 0.031567
- Heliocentric radial velocity: 9,464 km/s ± 3
- Distance: 521 Mly (160 Mpc)
- Group or cluster: Abell 1314
- Apparent magnitude (V): 14.1

Characteristics
- Type: E?
- Size: ~129,000 ly (39.5 kpc) (estimated)

Other designations
- CGCG 242-053, MCG +08-21-062, PGC 35780, NSA 038413, WBL 339-003, NVSS J113446+485720, 2MASX J11344658+4857217

IC 711 is an elliptical galaxy located in the constellation of Ursa Major. The redshift of the galaxy is (z) 0.031 and it was first discovered by an American astronomer named Lewis Swift on May 11, 1890, who described it as ordinary elliptical when viewed in visible light. It is also a member of the galaxy cluster, Abell 1314, which also includes the galaxies; IC 708, IC 709 and IC 712.

== Description ==
IC 711 is categorized as a narrow angle tail (NAT) radio galaxy that hosts a head-tail radio source that is found to be associated with it along with IC 708. When observed in 1987, it is found to display a radio tail structure that extents outwards from its nucleus with a wide distance of around 930 kiloparsecs, thus making this the longest known of this type. There is also a radio head feature that has signs of a major polarization peak; this suggests depolarization. From the head along the tail, the spectra index between 0.6 and 1.4 GHz frequencies, is found to increase although the spectra does remain constant in some areas of the source.

Further observations made in 2020, have shown the spectral index for the head feature is mainly flat between the frequencies of 240 and 1300 MHz, with Very Large Array showing the approximate flux density is 25.92 ± 0.03 when observed at 1.5 GHz, 24.30 ± 0.02 at 4.5 GHz and even 23.23 ± 0.01 at around 7.5 GHz. There are also twin-sided jets present in the galaxy, depicted having an asymmetric appearance in the innermost regions. Evidence also found the tail feature is mainly straight, showing at least two bends. The tail spectrum increasing becomes more steep as the distance from the head feature increases until it reaches the end points of the tail.
