= Stoessel lute =

Musical instrument

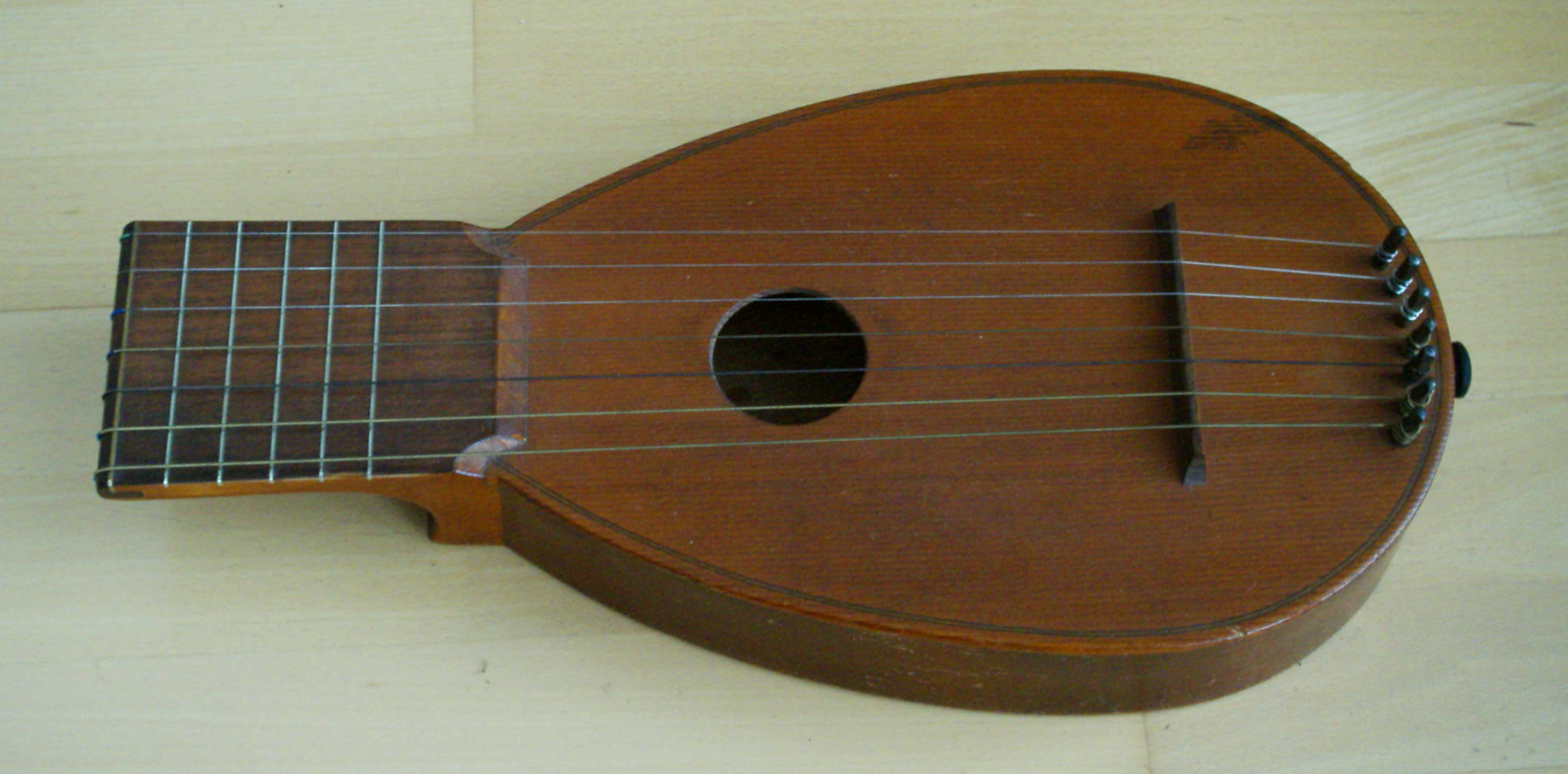

String instrument
- Other names: Stössel lute, Stössel-laute
- Classification: String instrument
- Hornbostel–Sachs classification: (Composite chordophone)

The Stoessel lute (German: Stössel-Laute) is a string instrument invented by Georg Stössel in 1914 in Cologne (Köln), Germany. Its steel strings are fingered not by putting one's hand round the neck, but over the end of it. To this end, most Stössel lutes have very short necks. It is, in effect, a hybrid between a necked string instrument (or a Lute) and a zither making it a Lute Zither.

The instrument was very popular in Germany and elsewhere in the early 20th century; it was frequently used in German and Austrian schools in the inter-war period. The Second World War put an end to production and the instrument never regained its former popularity. However as of 2024, this instrument has been resurrected in an Electrified Version w/ Pickups, & also a version w/ Nylon strings for musicians w/ hurt hands. The tuning of this instrument is 2 sets of 5ths "interleaved together". E.G. for the 9 String Stossel Lute (& 18 string Stossel Mandolin which is a Double Strung version w/ 9 pairs of strings, the lowest 4 or 6 pairs sometimes in Octaves) the strings are tuned in 5ths like a Five-string violin & then a 2nd group of 5ths is inserted starting w/ the Minor Third of the lowest note.

C3, Eb3, G3, Bb3, D4, F4, A4, C5, E5

(18 string Version) C3/C4, Eb3/Eb4, G3/G4, Bb3/Bb4, D4/D5, F4/F5, A4/A4, C5/C5, E5/E5

Some Instruments (the Bass & Contrabass Stossel Lutes) have 12 or 13 Open Strings to the Right of the Fretted Strings which provide accompaniment to the Fretted Strings

Bass Stossel Lute Accompaniment Strings

(C#3), G#2, Eb3, Bb2, F3, C3, G2, D3, A2, E3, B2, F#3, C#3

Contrabass Stossel Lute (The Open Strings are twice as long as those on the Bass Stossel Lute so they're an Octave Down)

(C#2), G#1, Eb2, Bb1, F2, C2, G1, D2, A1, E2, B1, F#2, C#2
