= De Longchamps point =

Orthocenter of a triangle's anticomplementary triangle

The de Longchamps point L of triangle △ABC, formed as the reflection of the orthocenter H about the circumcenter O or as the orthocenter of the anticomplementary triangle △A'B'C'

In geometry, the de Longchamps point of a triangle is a triangle center named after French mathematician Gaston Albert Gohierre de Longchamps. It is the reflection of the orthocenter of the triangle about the circumcenter.

== Definition ==
Let the given triangle have vertices $A$, $B$, and $C$, opposite the respective sides $a$, $b$, and $c$, as is the standard notation in triangle geometry. In the 1886 paper in which he introduced this point, de Longchamps initially defined it as the center of a circle $\Delta$ orthogonal to the three circles $\Delta_a$, $\Delta_b$, and $\Delta_c$, where $\Delta_a$ is centered at $A$ with radius $a$ and the other two circles are defined symmetrically. De Longchamps then also showed that the same point, now known as the de Longchamps point, may be equivalently defined as the orthocenter of the anticomplementary triangle of $ABC$, and that it is the reflection of the orthocenter of $ABC$ around the circumcenter.

The Steiner circle of a triangle is concentric with the nine-point circle and has radius 3/2 the circumradius of the triangle; the de Longchamps point is the homothetic center of the Steiner circle and the circumcircle.

== Additional properties ==
As the reflection of the orthocenter around the circumcenter, the de Longchamps point belongs to the line through both of these points, which is the Euler line of the given triangle. Thus, it is collinear with all the other triangle centers on the Euler line, which along with the orthocenter and circumcenter include the centroid and the center of the nine-point circle.

The de Longchamp point is also collinear, along a different line, with the incenter and the Gergonne point of its triangle. The three circles centered at $A$, $B$, and $C$, with radii $s-a$, $s-b$, and $s-c$ respectively (where $s$ is the semiperimeter) are mutually tangent, and there are two more circles tangent to all three of them, the inner and outer Soddy circles; the centers of these two circles also lie on the same line with the de Longchamp point and the incenter. The de Longchamp point is the point of concurrence of this line with the Euler line, and with three other lines defined in a similar way as the line through the incenter but using instead the three excenters of the triangle.

The Darboux cubic may be defined from the de Longchamps point, as the locus of points $X$ such that $X$, the isogonal conjugate of $X$, and the de Longchamps point are collinear. It is the only cubic curve invariant of a triangle that is both isogonally self-conjugate and centrally symmetric; its center of symmetry is the circumcenter of the triangle. The de Longchamps point itself lies on this curve, as does its reflection the orthocenter.
