= Sylvester's determinant identity =

Identity in algebra useful for evaluating certain types of determinants

In matrix theory, Sylvester's determinant identity is an identity useful for evaluating certain types of determinants. It is named after James Joseph Sylvester, who stated this identity without proof in 1851.

Given an n-by-n matrix $A$, let $\det(A)$ denote its determinant. Choose a pair

$$u =(u_1, \dots, u_m),  v =(v_1, \dots, v_m) \subset (1, \dots, n)$$

of m-element ordered subsets of $(1, \dots, n)$, where m ≤ n. Let $A^u_v$ denote the (n−m)-by-(n−m) submatrix of $A$ obtained by deleting the rows in $u$ and the columns in $v$. Define the auxiliary m-by-m matrix $\tilde{A}^u_v$ whose elements are equal to the following determinants

$$(\tilde{A}^u_v)_{ij} := \det(A^{u[\hat{u}_i]}_{v[\hat{v}_j]}),$$

where $u[\hat{u_i}]$, $v[\hat{v_j}]$ denote the m−1 element subsets of $u$ and $v$ obtained by deleting the elements $u_i$ and $v_j$, respectively. Then the following is Sylvester's determinantal identity (Sylvester, 1851):

$$\det(A)(\det(A^u_v))^{m-1}=\det(\tilde{A}^u_v).$$

When m = 2, this is the Desnanot–Jacobi identity (Jacobi, 1851).

== See also ==
- Weinstein–Aronszajn identity, which is sometimes attributed to Sylvester
