= Euler line =

Line constructed from a triangle

Euler's line, with the center of the nine-point circle Medians (intersect at the centroid) Altitudes (intersect at the orthocenter) Perpendicular lines from the side midpoints (intersect at the circumcenter)

In geometry, the Euler line, named after Leonhard Euler (/ˈɔɪlər/ OY-lər), is a line determined from any triangle that is not equilateral. It is a central line of the triangle, and it passes through several important points determined from the triangle, including the orthocenter, the circumcenter, the centroid, the Exeter point and the center of the nine-point circle of the triangle.

The concept of a triangle's Euler line extends to the Euler line of other shapes, such as the quadrilateral and the tetrahedron.

== Triangle centers on the Euler line ==
=== Individual centers ===
Euler showed in 1765 that in any triangle, the orthocenter, circumcenter and centroid are collinear. This property is also true for another triangle center, the nine-point center, although it had not been defined in Euler's time. In equilateral triangles, these four points coincide, but in any other triangle they are all distinct from each other, and the Euler line is determined by any two of them.

Other notable points that lie on the Euler line include the de Longchamps point, the Schiffler point, the Exeter point, and the Gossard perspector. However, the incenter generally does not lie on the Euler line; it is on the Euler line only for isosceles triangles, for which the Euler line coincides with the symmetry axis of the triangle and contains all triangle centers.

The tangential triangle of a reference triangle is tangent to the latter's circumcircle at the reference triangle's vertices. The circumcenter of the tangential triangle lies on the Euler line of the reference triangle. The center of similitude of the orthic and tangential triangles is also on the Euler line.

== Proofs ==
=== A vector proof ===
Let $ABC$ be a triangle. A proof of the fact that the circumcenter $O$, the centroid $G$ and the orthocenter $H$ are collinear relies on free vectors. We start by stating the prerequisites. First, $G$ satisfies the relation
$$\vec{GA}+\vec{GB}+\vec{GC}=0.$$

This follows from the fact that the absolute barycentric coordinates of $G$ are $\frac{1}{3}:\frac{1}{3}:\frac{1}{3}$. Further, the problem of Sylvester reads as
$$\vec{OH}=\vec{OA}+\vec{OB}+\vec{OC}.$$

Now, using the vector addition, we deduce that
$$\begin{align}
\vec{GO}&=\vec{GA}+\vec{AO}&&\mbox{(in triangle }AGO\mbox{)},\\
\vec{GO}&=\vec{GB}+\vec{BO}&&\mbox{(in triangle }BGO\mbox{)},\\
\vec{GO}&=\vec{GC}+\vec{CO}&&\mbox{(in triangle }CGO\mbox{)}.
\end{align}$$

By adding these three relations, term by term, we obtain that
$$3\cdot\vec{GO}=\left(\sum\limits_{\scriptstyle\rm cyc}\vec{GA}\right)+\left(\sum\limits_{\scriptstyle\rm cyc}\vec{AO}\right)=0-\left(\sum\limits_{\scriptstyle\rm cyc}\vec{OA}\right)=-\vec{OH}.$$

In conclusion, $3\cdot\vec{OG}=\vec{OH}$, and so the three points $O$, $G$ and $H$ (in this order) are collinear.

In Dörrie's book, the Euler line and the problem of Sylvester are put together into a single proof. However, most of the proofs of the problem of Sylvester rely on the fundamental properties of free vectors, independently of the Euler line.

== Properties ==
=== Distances between centers ===
On the Euler line the centroid $G$ is between the circumcenter $O$ and the orthocenter $H$ and is twice as far from the orthocenter as it is from the circumcenter:
$$GH=2OG;$$
$$OH=3OG.$$

The segment $GH$ is a diameter of the orthocentroidal circle.

The center $N$ of the nine-point circle lies along the Euler line midway between the orthocenter and the circumcenter:
$$ON = NH, \quad OG =2\cdot GN, \quad NH=3GN.$$

Thus the Euler line could be repositioned on a number line with the circumcenter $O$ at the location 0, the centroid $G$ at $2t$, the nine-point center $N$ at $3t$, and the orthocenter $H$ at $6t$ for some scale factor $t$.

Furthermore, the squared distance between the centroid and the circumcenter along the Euler line is less than the squared circumradius $R^2$ by an amount equal to one-ninth the sum of the squares of the side lengths $a$, $b$, and $c$:
$$OG^2=R^2-\tfrac{1}{9}(a^2+b^2+c^2).$$

In addition,
$$OH^2=9R^2-(a^2+b^2+c^2);$$
$$GH^2=4R^2-\tfrac{4}{9}(a^2+b^2+c^2).$$

== Representation ==
=== Equation ===
Let $A$, $B$, $C$ denote the vertex angles of the reference triangle, and let $x : y : z$ be a variable point in trilinear coordinates; then an equation for the Euler line is
$$\sin (2A) \sin(B - C)x + \sin (2B) \sin(C - A)y + \sin (2C) \sin(A - B)z = 0.$$

An equation for the Euler line in barycentric coordinates $\alpha :\beta :\gamma$ is
$$(\tan C -\tan B)\alpha +(\tan A -\tan C)\beta + (\tan B -\tan A)\gamma =0.$$

=== Parametric representation ===
Another way to represent the Euler line is in terms of a parameter $t$. Starting with the circumcenter (with trilinear coordinates $\cos A : \cos B : \cos C$) and the orthocenter (with trilinears $\sec A : \sec B : \sec C = \cos B \cos C : \cos C \cos A : \cos A \cos B),$ every point on the Euler line, except the orthocenter, is given by the trilinear coordinates
$$\cos A + t \cos B \cos C : \cos B + t \cos C \cos A : \cos C + t \cos A \cos B$$
formed as a linear combination of the trilinears of these two points, for some $t$.

For example:

- The circumcenter has trilinears $\cos A:\cos B:\cos C,$ corresponding to the parameter value $t=0.$
- The centroid has trilinears $\cos A + \cos B \cos C : \cos B + \cos C \cos A : \cos C + \cos A \cos B,$ corresponding to the parameter value $t=1.$
- The nine-point center has trilinears $\cos A + 2 \cos B \cos C : \cos B + 2 \cos C \cos A : \cos C + 2 \cos A \cos B,$ corresponding to the parameter value $t=2.$
- The de Longchamps point has trilinears $\cos A - \cos B \cos C : \cos B - \cos C \cos A : \cos C - \cos A \cos B,$ corresponding to the parameter value $t=-1.$

=== Slope ===
In a Cartesian coordinate system, denote the slopes of the sides of a triangle as $m_1,$ $m_2,$ and $m_3,$ and denote the slope of its Euler line as $m_E$. Then these slopes are related according to
$$\begin{align}
m_1m_2 &+ m_1m_3 + m_1m_E + m_2m_3 + m_2m_E + m_3m_E \\
{}&+ 3m_1m_2m_3m_E + 3 = 0.
\end{align}$$

Thus the slope of the Euler line (if finite) is expressible in terms of the slopes of the sides as
$$m_E=-\frac{m_1m_2 + m_1m_3 + m_2m_3 + 3}{m_1 + m_2 + m_3 + 3m_1m_2m_3}.$$

Moreover, the Euler line is parallel to an acute triangle's side $BC$ if and only if $\tan B \tan C = 3.$

== Relation to inscribed equilateral triangles ==
The locus of the centroids of equilateral triangles inscribed in a given triangle is formed by two lines perpendicular to the given triangle's Euler line.

== In special triangles ==
=== Right triangle ===
In a right triangle, the Euler line coincides with the median to the hypotenuse—that is, it goes through both the right-angled vertex and the midpoint of the side opposite that vertex. This is because the right triangle's orthocenter, the intersection of its altitudes, falls on the right-angled vertex while its circumcenter, the intersection of its perpendicular bisectors of sides, falls on the midpoint of the hypotenuse.

=== Isosceles triangle ===
The Euler line of an isosceles triangle coincides with the axis of symmetry. In an isosceles triangle the incenter falls on the Euler line.

=== Automedian triangle ===
The Euler line of an automedian triangle (one whose medians are in the same proportions, though in the opposite order, as the sides) is perpendicular to one of the medians.

=== Systems of triangles with concurrent Euler lines ===
Consider a triangle $ABC$ with Fermat–Torricelli points $F_1$ and $F_2$. The Euler lines of the 10 triangles with vertices chosen from $A$, $B$, $C$, $F_1$ and $F_2$ are concurrent at the centroid of triangle $ABC$.

The Euler lines of the four triangles formed by an orthocentric system (a set of four points such that each is the orthocenter of the triangle with vertices at the other three points) are concurrent at the nine-point center common to all of the triangles.

== Generalizations ==
=== Quadrilateral ===
In a convex quadrilateral, the quasiorthocenter $H$, the "area centroid" $G$, and the quasicircumcenter $O$ are collinear in this order on the Euler line, and $HG = 2GO$.

=== Tetrahedron ===
A tetrahedron is a three-dimensional object bounded by four triangular faces. Seven lines associated with a tetrahedron are concurrent at its centroid; its six midplanes intersect at its Monge point; and there is a circumsphere passing through all of the vertices, whose center is the circumcenter. These points define the "Euler line" of a tetrahedron analogous to that of a triangle. The centroid is the midpoint between its Monge point and circumcenter along this line. The center of the twelve-point sphere also lies on the Euler line.

=== Simplicial polytope ===
A simplicial polytope is a polytope whose facets are all simplices (plural of simplex). For example, every polygon is a simplicial polytope. The Euler line associated to such a polytope is the line determined by its centroid and circumcenter of mass. This definition of an Euler line generalizes the ones above.

Suppose that $P$ is a polygon. The Euler line $E$ is sensitive to the symmetries of $P$ in the following ways:

1. If $P$ has a line of reflection symmetry $L$, then $E$ is either $L$ or a point on $L$.
2. If $P$ has a center of rotational symmetry $C$, then $E=C$.

== Related constructions ==
A triangle's Kiepert parabola is the unique parabola that is tangent to the sides (two of them extended) of the triangle and has the Euler line as its directrix.
