= Gaston Albert Gohierre de Longchamps =

French mathematician (1842–1906)

Gaston Albert Gohierre de Longchamps (1 March 1842 – 9 July 1906) was a French mathematician.

Gohierre de Longchamps was born on 1 March 1842 in Alençon. He studied at the École Normale Supérieure beginning in 1863, and began a career as a teacher beginning in 1866. He retired from the Lycée Saint-Louis, his final teaching position, in 1897, and died in Paris on 9 July 1906.

De Longchamps was a member of many international scientific societies, and in 1892 became a chevalier of the Legion of Honor. He was the editor of the Journal de mathématiques élémentaires and an associated journal, the Journal de mathématiques spéciales, taking both journals over from their founder J. Bourget. The de Longchamps point of a triangle is named after him, for his 1886 study that identified this point.
