= Bifolium =

Quartic plane curve

Bifolium with a = 1

A bifolium is a quartic plane curve with equation in Cartesian coordinates:

$$(x^2 + y^2)^2 = ax^2y.$$

== Construction and equations ==
Construction of the bifolium

Given a circle C through a point O, and line L tangent to the circle at point O: for each point Q on C, define the point P such that PQ is parallel to the tangent line L, and PQ = OQ. The collection of points P forms the bifolium.

In polar coordinates, the bifolium's equation is

$$\rho=a\sin\theta\cdot\cos^2\theta,$$
while (first eqn.)
$$\rho^{2\cdot2}=a\cdot x^2y,\,\,\rho^2=\pm x\cdot(ay)^{1/2}.$$

For a = 1, the total included area is approximately 0.10.

== See also ==
- Folium of Descartes
- Trifolium curve
