= Sylvester's formula =

Formula in matrix theory

In matrix theory, Sylvester's formula or Sylvester's matrix theorem (named after J. J. Sylvester) or Lagrange−Sylvester interpolation expresses an analytic function f (A) of a matrix A as a polynomial in A, in terms of the eigenvalues and eigenvectors of A. It states that

$$f(A) = \sum_{i=1}^k f(\lambda_i) ~A_i ~,$$

where the λ_{i} are the eigenvalues of A, and the matrices

$$A_i \equiv \prod_{j=1 \atop j \ne i}^k \frac{1}{\lambda_i - \lambda_j} \left(A - \lambda_j I\right)$$

are the corresponding Frobenius covariants of A, which are (projection) matrix Lagrange polynomials of A.

== Conditions ==
Sylvester's formula applies for any diagonalizable matrix A with k distinct eigenvalues, λ_{1}, ..., λ_{k}, and any function f defined on some subset of the complex numbers such that f(A) is well defined. The last condition means that every eigenvalue λ_{i} is in the domain of f, and that every eigenvalue λ_{i} with multiplicity m_{i} > 1 is in the interior of the domain, with f being (m_{i} - 1) times differentiable at λ_{i}.

== Example ==
Consider the two-by-two matrix:

$$A = \begin{bmatrix} 1 & 3 \\ 4 & 2 \end{bmatrix}.$$

This matrix has two eigenvalues, 5 and −2. Its Frobenius covariants are

$$\begin{align}
A_1 &= c_1 r_1 = \begin{bmatrix} 3 \\ 4 \end{bmatrix} \begin{bmatrix} \frac{1}{7} & \frac{1}{7} \end{bmatrix} = \begin{bmatrix} \frac{3}{7} & \frac{3}{7} \\ \frac{4}{7} & \frac{4}{7} \end{bmatrix} = \frac{A + 2I}{5 - (-2)}\\
A_2 &= c_2 r_2 = \begin{bmatrix} \frac{1}{7} \\ -\frac{1}{7} \end{bmatrix} \begin{bmatrix} 4 & -3 \end{bmatrix} = \begin{bmatrix} \frac{4}{7} & -\frac{3}{7} \\ -\frac{4}{7} & \frac{3}{7} \end{bmatrix} = \frac{A - 5I}{-2 - 5}.
\end{align}$$

Sylvester's formula then amounts to

$$f(A) = f(5) A_1 + f(-2) A_2. \,$$

For instance, if f is defined by f(x) = x^{−1}, then Sylvester's formula expresses the matrix inverse f(A) = A^{−1} as

$$\frac{1}{5} \begin{bmatrix} \frac{3}{7} & \frac{3}{7} \\ \frac{4}{7} & \frac{4}{7} \end{bmatrix} - \frac{1}{2} \begin{bmatrix} \frac{4}{7} & -\frac{3}{7} \\ -\frac{4}{7} & \frac{3}{7} \end{bmatrix} = \begin{bmatrix} -0.2 & 0.3 \\ 0.4 & -0.1 \end{bmatrix}.$$

== Generalization ==
Sylvester's formula is only valid for matrices with no repeated eigenvalues; an extension due to Arthur Buchheim, based on Hermite interpolating polynomials, covers the general case:

$$f(A) = \sum_{i=1}^{s} \left[ \sum_{j=0}^{n_{i}-1} \frac{1}{j!} \phi_i^{(j)}(\lambda_i)\left(A - \lambda_i I\right)^j \prod_{{j=1,j\ne i}}^{s}\left(A - \lambda_j I\right)^{n_j} \right]$$,

where $\phi_i(t) := f(t)/\prod_{j\ne i}\left(t - \lambda_j\right)^{n_j}$.

a concise form of the generalized Sylvester's formula is further given by Hans Schwerdtfeger,

$$f(A)=\sum_{i=1}^{s} A_{i} \sum_{j=0}^{n_{i}-1} \frac{f^{(j)}(\lambda_i)}{j!}(A-\lambda_iI)^{j}$$,

where A_{i} are the corresponding generalized Frobenius covariants of A

== Special case ==
If a matrix A is both Hermitian and unitary, then it can only have eigenvalues of $\plusmn 1$, and therefore $A=A_+-A_-$, where $A_+$ is the projector onto the subspace with eigenvalue +1, and $A_-$ is the projector onto the subspace with eigenvalue $- 1$; By the completeness of the eigenbasis, $A_++A_-=I$. Therefore, for any analytic function f,

$$\begin{align} f(\theta A)&=f(\theta)A_{+}+f(-\theta)A_{-} \\
&=f(\theta)\frac{I+A}{2}+f(-\theta)\frac{I-A}{2}\\
&=\frac{f(\theta)+f(-\theta)}{2}I+\frac{f(\theta)-f(-\theta)}{2}A\\
\end{align} .$$

In particular, $e^{i\theta A}=(\cos \theta)I+(i\sin \theta) A$ and $A =e^{i\frac{\pi}{2}(I-A)}=e^{-i\frac{\pi}{2}(I-A)}$.

== See also ==
- Adjugate matrix
- Holomorphic functional calculus
- Resolvent formalism
