= Evectant =

In mathematical invariant theory, an evectant is a contravariant constructed from an invariant by acting on it with a differential operator called an evector. Evectants and evectors were introduced by James Sylvester.
