= Weinstein–Aronszajn identity =

For two suitable matrices, A and B, I+AB and I+BA have the same determinant

In mathematics, the Weinstein–Aronszajn identity states that if $A$ and $B$ are matrices of size m × n and n × m respectively (either or both of which may be infinite) then, provided $AB$ (and hence, also $BA$) is of trace class,

$$\det(I_m + AB) = \det(I_n + BA),$$

where $I_k$ is the k × k identity matrix.

It is closely related to the matrix determinant lemma and its generalization. It is the determinant analogue of the Woodbury matrix identity for matrix inverses.

== Proof ==
The identity may be proved as follows. Let $M$ be a matrix consisting of the four blocks $I_m$, $A$, $B$ and $I_n$:

$$M = \begin{pmatrix} I_m & A \\ B & I_n \end{pmatrix}.$$

Because I_{m} is invertible, the formula for the determinant of a block matrix gives

$$\det\!\begin{pmatrix} I_m & A \\ B & I_n \end{pmatrix} = \det(I_m) \det(I_n - B I_m^{-1} A) = \det(I_n - BA).$$

Because I_{n} is invertible, the formula for the determinant of a block matrix gives

$$\det\!\begin{pmatrix} I_m & A\\ B & I_n \end{pmatrix} = \det(I_n) \det(I_m - A I_n^{-1} B) = \det(I_m - AB).$$

Thus

$$\det(I_n - B A) = \det(I_m - A B).$$

Substituting $-A$ for $A$ then gives the Weinstein–Aronszajn identity.

== Applications ==
Let $\lambda \in \mathbb{R} \setminus \{0\}$. The identity can be used to show the somewhat more general statement that

$$\det(AB - \lambda I_m) = (-\lambda)^{m - n} \det(BA - \lambda I_n).$$

It follows that the non-zero eigenvalues of $AB$ and $BA$ are the same.

This identity is useful in developing a Bayes estimator for multivariate Gaussian distributions.

The identity also finds applications in random matrix theory by relating determinants of large matrices to determinants of smaller ones.
