= Centroid =

Mean position of all the points in a shape

The red lines intersect at the centroid of the triangle.

In mathematics and physics, the centroid, also known as a geometric center or center of figure, of a plane figure or solid figure is the mean position of all the points in the figure. The same definition extends to any object in $n$-dimensional Euclidean space.

In geometry, one often assumes uniform mass density, in which case the barycenter or center of mass coincides with the centroid. Informally, it can be understood as the point at which a cutout of the shape (with uniformly distributed mass) could be perfectly balanced on the tip of a pin.

In physics, if variations in gravity are considered, then a center of gravity can be defined as the weighted mean of all points weighted by their specific weight.

In geography, the centroid of a radial projection of a region of the Earth's surface to sea level is the region's geographical center.

== History ==
The term "centroid" was coined in 1814. It is used as a substitute for the older terms "center of gravity" and "center of mass" when the purely geometrical aspects of that point are to be emphasized. The term is particular to the English language; French, for instance, uses "centre de gravité" on most occasions, and other languages use terms of similar meaning.

The center of gravity, as the name indicates, is a notion that arose in mechanics, most likely in connection with building activities. It is uncertain when the idea first appeared, as the concept likely occurred to many people individually with minor differences. Nonetheless, the center of gravity of figures was studied extensively in Antiquity; Bossut credits Archimedes (287–212 BCE) with being the first to find the centroid of plane figures, although he never defines it. A treatment of centroids of solids by Archimedes has been lost.

It is unlikely that Archimedes learned the theorem that the medians of a triangle meet in a point—the center of gravity of the triangle—directly from Euclid, as this proposition is not in the Elements. The first explicit statement of this proposition is due to Heron of Alexandria (perhaps the first century CE) and occurs in his Mechanics. It may be added, in passing, that the proposition did not become common in the textbooks on plane geometry until the nineteenth century.

== Properties ==
The geometric centroid of a convex object always lies in the object. A non-convex object might have a centroid that is outside the figure itself. The centroid of a ring or a bowl, for example, lies in the object's central void.

If the centroid is defined, it is a fixed point of all isometries in its symmetry group. In particular, the geometric centroid of an object lies in the intersection of all its hyperplanes of symmetry. The centroid of many figures (regular polygon, regular polyhedron, cylinder, rectangle, rhombus, circle, sphere, ellipse, ellipsoid, superellipse, superellipsoid, etc.) can be determined by this principle alone.

In particular, the centroid of a parallelogram is the meeting point of its two diagonals. This is not true of other quadrilaterals.

For the same reason, the centroid of an object with translational symmetry is undefined (or lies outside the enclosing space), because a translation has no fixed point.

== Examples ==
The centroid of a triangle is the intersection of the three medians of the triangle (each median connecting a vertex with the midpoint of the opposite side).

For other properties of a triangle's centroid, see below.

== Determination ==
=== Plumb line method ===
The centroid of a uniformly dense planar lamina, such as in figure (a) below, may be determined experimentally by using a plumbline and a pin to find the collocated center of mass of a thin body of uniform density having the same shape. The body is held by the pin, inserted at a point, off the presumed centroid in such a way that it can freely rotate around the pin; the plumb line is then dropped from the pin (figure b). The position of the plumbline is traced on the surface, and the procedure is repeated with the pin inserted at any different point (or a number of points) off the centroid of the object. The unique intersection point of these lines will be the centroid (figure c). Provided that the body is of uniform density, all lines made this way will include the centroid, and all lines will cross at exactly the same place.

(a)

(b)

(c)

This method can be extended (in theory) to concave shapes where the centroid may lie outside the shape, and virtually to solids (again, of uniform density), where the centroid may lie within the body. The (virtual) positions of the plumb lines need to be recorded by means other than by drawing them along the shape.

=== Balancing method ===
For convex two-dimensional shapes, the centroid can be found by balancing the shape on a smaller shape, such as the top of a narrow cylinder. The centroid occurs somewhere within the range of contact between the two shapes (and exactly at the point where the shape would balance on a pin). In principle, progressively narrower cylinders can be used to find the centroid to arbitrary precision. In practice air currents make this infeasible. However, by marking the overlap range from multiple balances, one can achieve a considerable level of accuracy.

=== Of a finite set of points ===
The centroid of a finite set of $k$ points $\mathbf{x}_1,\mathbf{x}_2,\ldots,\mathbf{x}_k$ in $\R^n$ is
$$\mathbf{C} = \frac{\mathbf{x}_1 + \mathbf{x}_2 + \cdots + \mathbf{x}_k}{k} .$$
This point minimizes the sum of squared Euclidean distances between itself and each point in the set.

=== By geometric decomposition ===
The centroid of a plane figure $X$ can be computed by dividing it into a finite number of simpler figures $X_1, X_2, \dots, X_n,$ computing the centroid $C_i$ and area $A_i$ of each part, and then computing

$$C_x = \frac{\sum_i {C_i}_x A_i}{\sum_i A_i}, \quad
C_y = \frac{\sum_i {C_i}_y A_i}{\sum_i A_i}.$$

Holes in the figure $X,$ overlaps between the parts, or parts that extend outside the figure can all be handled using negative areas $A_i.$ Namely, the measures $A_i$ should be taken with positive and negative signs in such a way that the sum of the signs of $A_i$ for all parts that enclose a given point $p$ is $1$ if $p$ belongs to $X,$ and $0$ otherwise.

For example, the figure below (a) is easily divided into a square and a triangle, both with positive area; and a circular hole, with negative area (b).

(a) 2D Object

(b) Object described using simpler elements

(c) Centroids of elements of the object

The centroid of each part can be found in any list of centroids of simple shapes (c). Then the centroid of the figure is the weighted average of the three points. The horizontal position of the centroid, from the left edge of the figure is
$$x = \frac{5 \times 10^2 + 13.33 \times \frac{1}{2}10^2 - 3 \times \pi(2.5)^2}{10^2 + \frac{1}{2}10^2 -\pi(2.5)^2} \approx 8.5 \text{ units}.$$
The vertical position of the centroid is found in the same way.

The same formula holds for any three-dimensional objects, except that each $A_i$ should be the volume of $X_i,$ rather than its area. It also holds for any subset of $\R^d,$ for any dimension $d,$ with the areas replaced by the $d$-dimensional measures of the parts.

=== By integral formula ===
The centroid of a subset $X$ of $\R^n$ can also be computed by the vector formula

$$C = \frac{\int x g(x) \ dx}{\int g(x) \ dx} = \frac{\int_X x \ dx}{\int_X dx}$$

where the integrals are taken over the whole space $\R^n,$ and $g$ is the characteristic function of the subset $X$ of $\R^n \! : \ g(x) = 1$ if $x \in X$ and $g(x) = 0$ otherwise. Note that the denominator is simply the measure of the set $X.$ This formula cannot be applied if the set $X$ has zero measure, or if either integral diverges.

Alternatively, the coordinate-wise formula for the centroid is defined as

$$C_k = \frac{\int z S_k(z) \ dz}{\int g(x) \ dx},$$

where $C_k$ is the $k$th coordinate of $C,$ and $S_k(z)$ is the measure of the intersection of $X$ with the hyperplane defined by the equation $x_k = z.$ Again, the denominator is simply the measure of $X.$

For a plane figure, in particular, the barycentric coordinates are

$$C_{\mathrm x} = \frac{\int x S_{\mathrm y}(x) \ dx}{A}, \quad
C_{\mathrm y} = \frac{\int y S_{\mathrm x}(y) \ dy}{A},$$

where $A$ is the area of the figure $X,$ $S_{\mathrm y}(x)$ is the length of the intersection of $X$ with the vertical line at abscissa $x,$ and $S_{\mathrm x}(y)$ is the length of the intersection of $X$ with the horizontal line at ordinate $y.$

==== Of a bounded region ====
The centroid $(\bar{x},\;\bar{y})$ of a region bounded by the graphs of the continuous functions $f$ and $g$ such that $f(x) \geq g(x)$ on the interval $[a, b],$ $a \leq x \leq b$ is given by

$$\begin{align}
\bar{x} &= \frac{1}{A}\int_a^b x\bigl(f(x) - g(x)\bigr)\,dx, \\[5mu]
\bar{y} &= \frac{1}{A}\int_a^b \tfrac12\bigl(f(x) + g(x)\bigr)\bigl(f(x) - g(x)\bigr)\,dx,
\end{align}$$

where $A$ is the area of the region (given by $\int_a^b \bigl(f(x) - g(x)\bigr) dx$).

=== With an integraph ===
An integraph (a relative of the planimeter) can be used to find the centroid of an object of irregular shape with smooth (or piecewise smooth) boundary. The mathematical principle involved is a special case of Green's theorem.

=== Of an L-shaped object ===
This is a method of determining the centroid of an L-shaped object.

1. Divide the shape into two rectangles, as shown in fig 2. Find the centroids of these two rectangles by drawing the diagonals. Draw a line joining the centroids. The centroid of the shape must lie on this line $AB.$
2. Divide the shape into two other rectangles, as shown in fig 3. Find the centroids of these two rectangles by drawing the diagonals. Draw a line joining the centroids. The centroid of the L-shape must lie on this line $CD.$
3. As the centroid of the shape must lie along $AB$ and also along $CD,$ it must be at the intersection of these two lines, at $O.$ The point $O$ might lie inside or outside the L-shaped object.

=== Of a triangle ===

The centroid of a triangle is the point of intersection of its medians (the lines joining each vertex with the midpoint of the opposite side). The centroid divides each of the medians in the ratio $2:1,$ which is to say it is located $\tfrac13$ of the distance from each side to the opposite vertex (see figures at right). Its Cartesian coordinates are the means of the coordinates of the three vertices. That is, if the three vertices are $L = (x_L, y_L),$ $M= (x_M, y_M),$ and $N= (x_N, y_N),$ then the centroid (denoted $C$ here but most commonly denoted $G$ in triangle geometry) is

$$C = \tfrac13(L+M+N)
= \bigl( \tfrac13 (x_L+x_M+x_N), \tfrac13 (y_L+y_M+y_N) \bigr).$$

The centroid is therefore at $\tfrac13:\tfrac13:\tfrac13$ in barycentric coordinates.

In trilinear coordinates the centroid can be expressed in any of these equivalent ways in terms of the side lengths $a, b, c$ and vertex angles $L, M, N$:

$$\begin{align}
C &= \frac{1}{a}:\frac{1}{b}:\frac{1}{c}
= bc:ca:ab = \csc L :\csc M:\csc N \\[6pt]
&= \cos L + \cos M \cdot \cos N :
\cos M + \cos N \cdot \cos L :
\cos N + \cos L \cdot \cos M.
\end{align}$$

The centroid is also the physical center of mass if the triangle is made from a uniform sheet of material; or if all the mass is concentrated at the three vertices, and evenly divided among them. On the other hand, if the mass is distributed along the triangle's perimeter, with uniform linear density, then the center of mass lies at the Spieker center (the incenter of the medial triangle), which does not (in general) coincide with the geometric centroid of the full triangle.

The area of the triangle is $\tfrac32$ times the length of any side times the perpendicular distance from the side to the centroid.

A triangle's centroid lies on its Euler line between its orthocenter $H$ and its circumcenter $O,$ exactly twice as close to the latter as to the former:

$$\overline{CH}=2\overline{CO}.$$

In addition, for the incenter $I$ and nine-point center $N,$ we have
$$\begin{align}
\overline{CH} &=4\overline{CN}, \\[5pt]
\overline{CO} &=2\overline{CN}, \\[5pt]
\overline{IC} &< \overline{HC}, \\[5pt]
\overline{IH} &< \overline{HC}, \\[5pt]
\overline{IC} &< \overline{IO}.
\end{align}$$

If $G$ is the centroid of the triangle $ABC,$ then

$$(\text{Area of }\triangle ABG)
= (\text{Area of }\triangle ACG)
= (\text{Area of }\triangle BCG)
= \tfrac13(\text{Area of }\triangle ABC).$$

The isogonal conjugate of a triangle's centroid is its symmedian point.

Any of the three medians through the centroid divides the triangle's area in half. This is not true for other lines through the centroid; the greatest departure from the equal-area division occurs when a line through the centroid is parallel to a side of the triangle, creating a smaller triangle and a trapezoid; in this case the trapezoid's area is $\tfrac59$ that of the original triangle.

Let $P$ be any point in the plane of a triangle with vertices $A, B, C$ and centroid $G.$ Then the sum of the squared distances of $P$ from the three vertices exceeds the sum of the squared distances of the centroid $G$ from the vertices by three times the squared distance between $P$ and $G$:

$$PA^2 + PB^2 + PC^2 = GA^2 + GB^2 + GC^2 + 3PG^2.$$

The sum of the squares of the triangle's sides equals three times the sum of the squared distances of the centroid from the vertices:

$$AB^2 + BC^2 + CA^2 = 3(GA^2 + GB^2 + GC^2).$$

A triangle's centroid is the point that maximizes the product of the directed distances of a point from the triangle's sidelines.

Let $ABC$ be a triangle, let $G$ be its centroid, and let $D, E, F$ be the midpoints of segments $BC, CA, AB,$ respectively. For any point $P$ in the plane of $ABC,$

$$PA + PB + PC \le 2(PD + PE + PF) + 3PG.$$

=== Of a polygon ===
The centroid of a non-self-intersecting closed polygon defined by $n$ vertices $(x_0, y_0),\;$$(x_1, y_1),\; \ldots,\;$$(x_{n-1}, y_{n-1}),$ is the point $(C_x, C_y),$ where

$$C_{\mathrm x} = \frac{1}{6A}\sum_{i=0}^{n-1}(x_i+x_{i+1})(x_i\ y_{i+1} - x_{i+1}\ y_i),$$

and

$$C_{\mathrm y} = \frac{1}{6A}\sum_{i=0}^{n-1}(y_i+y_{i+1})(x_i\ y_{i+1} - x_{i+1}\ y_i),$$

and where $A$ is the polygon's signed area, as described by the shoelace formula:

$$A = \frac{1}{2}\sum_{i=0}^{n-1} (x_i\ y_{i+1} - x_{i+1}\ y_i).$$

In these formulae, the vertices are assumed to be numbered in order of their occurrence along the polygon's perimeter; furthermore, the vertex $(x_n, y_n)$ is assumed to be the same as $(x_0, y_0),$ meaning $i+1$ on the last case must loop around to $i=0.$ (If the points are numbered in clockwise order, the area $A,$ computed as above, will be negative; however, the centroid coordinates will be correct even in this case.)

The centroid of a non-triangular polygon is not the same as its vertex centroid, considering only its vertex set (as the centroid of a finite set of points;).

=== Of a cone or pyramid ===
The centroid of a cone or pyramid is located on the line segment that connects the apex to the centroid of the base. For a solid cone or pyramid, the centroid is $\tfrac14$ the distance from the base to the apex. For a cone or pyramid that is just a shell (hollow) with no base, the centroid is $\tfrac13$ the distance from the base plane to the apex.

=== Of a tetrahedron and n-dimensional simplex ===
A tetrahedron is an object in three-dimensional space having four triangles as its faces. A line segment joining a vertex of a tetrahedron with the centroid of the opposite face is called a median, and a line segment joining the midpoints of two opposite edges is called a bimedian. Hence there are four medians and three bimedians. These seven line segments all meet at the centroid of the tetrahedron. The medians are divided by the centroid in the ratio $3:1.$ The centroid of a tetrahedron is the midpoint between its Monge point and circumcenter (center of the circumscribed sphere). These three points define the Euler line of the tetrahedron that is analogous to the Euler line of a triangle.

These results generalize to any $n$-dimensional simplex in the following way. If the set of vertices of a simplex is ${v_0,\ldots,v_n},$ then considering the vertices as vectors, the centroid is

$$C = \frac{1}{n+1}\sum_{i=0}^n v_i.$$

The geometric centroid coincides with the center of mass if the mass is uniformly distributed over the whole simplex, or concentrated at the vertices as $n+1$ equal masses.

=== Of a hemisphere ===
The centroid of a solid hemisphere (i.e. half of a solid ball) divides the line segment connecting the sphere's center to the hemisphere's pole in the ratio $3:5$ (i.e. it lies $\tfrac38$ of the way from the center to the pole). The centroid of a hollow hemisphere (i.e. half of a hollow sphere) divides the line segment connecting the sphere's center to the hemisphere's pole in half.

== See also ==
- Chebyshev center
- Circular mean
- Fréchet mean
- k-means algorithm
- List of centroids
- Medoid
- Pappus's centroid theorem
