= Prange =

Prange is a surname. Notable people with the surname include:

- Ashley Prange (born 1981), American golfer
- Eugene Prange (c. 1918 – 2006), American coding theorist
- Gordon Prange (1910–1980), American writer
- Greg Prange, American film editor
- Louis H. Prange, American politician
- Dori Elizabeth Prange, American Wrestler
- Ulf Prange (born 1975), German lawyer and politician
- Sebastian Prange, historian

== See also ==
- Littleton v. Prange
