= Andrew M. Gleason =

American mathematician and educator (1921–2008)

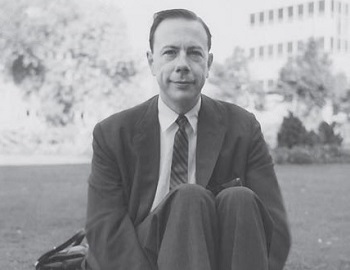
- Berlin, 1959
- Born: November 4, 1921; Fresno, California
- Died: October 17, 2008 (aged 86); Cambridge, Massachusetts
- Education: Yale University
- Known for: Hilbert's fifth problem; Gleason's theorem; Greenwood–Gleason graph; Gleason–Prange theorem; Gleason polynomials
- Spouse: Jean Berko (m. 1959)
- Awards: Newcomb Cleveland Prize (1952); Gung–Hu Distinguished Service to Mathematics Award (1996)
- Scientific career
- Fields: Mathematics, cryptography
- Workplaces: Harvard University
- Doctoral advisor: None
- Other academic advisors: George Mackey (Note: "Although Andy never earned a Ph.D., he thought of George [Mackey] as his mentor and advisor and lists himself as George's student on the Mathematics Genealogy Project website." It is customary at Harvard (as at many schools) to award a Harvard degree to tenured faculty who do not have such a degree already; in conjunction with his tenure, therefore, Gleason received a Harvard master's degree in 1953.)
- Doctoral students: Glen Bredon; Daniel I. A. Cohen; James Eells; Jessie MacWilliams; Richard Palais; Joel Spencer; T. Christine Stevens

Andrew Mattei Gleason (November 4, 1921 – October 17, 2008) was an American mathematician who made fundamental contributions to widely varied areas of mathematics, including the solution of Hilbert's fifth problem, and was a leader in reform and innovation in mathematics teaching at all levels. Gleason's theorem in quantum logic and the Greenwood–Gleason graph, an important example in Ramsey theory, are named for him.

As a young World War II naval officer, Gleason broke German and Japanese military codes. After the war he spent his entire academic career at Harvard University, from which he retired in 1992. His numerous academic and scholarly leadership posts included chairmanship of the Harvard Mathematics Department and the Harvard Society of Fellows, and presidency of the American Mathematical Society. He continued to advise the United States government on cryptographic security, and the Commonwealth of Massachusetts on mathematics education for children, almost until the end of his life.

Gleason won the Newcomb Cleveland Prize in 1952 and the Gung–Hu Distinguished Service Award of the American Mathematical Society in 1996. He was a member of the National Academy of Sciences and of the American Philosophical Society, and held the Hollis Chair of Mathematics and Natural Philosophy at Harvard.

He was fond of saying that mathematical proofs "really aren't there to convince you that something is true‍—‌they're there to show you why it is true." The Notices of the American Mathematical Society called him "one of the quiet giants of twentieth-century mathematics, the consummate professor dedicated to scholarship, teaching, and service in equal measure."

== Biography ==
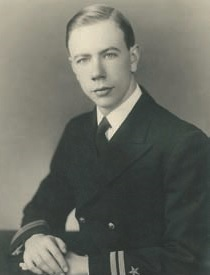
US Navy, 1940s

Gleason was born on November 4, 1921, in Fresno, California, the youngest of three children; his father Henry Gleason was a botanist and a member of the Mayflower Society, and his mother was the daughter of Swiss-American winemaker Andrew Mattei. His older brother Henry Jr. became a linguist. He grew up in Bronxville, New York, where his father was the curator of the New York Botanical Garden.

After briefly attending Berkeley High School (Berkeley, California) he graduated from Roosevelt High School in Yonkers, winning a scholarship to Yale University. Though Gleason's mathematics education had gone only so far as some self-taught calculus, Yale mathematician William Raymond Longley urged him to try a course in mechanics normally intended for juniors.

So I learned first year calculus and second year calculus and became the consultant to one end of the whole Old Campus ... I used to do all the homework for all the sections of [first-year calculus]. I got plenty of practice in doing elementary calculus problems. I don't think there exists a problem‍—‌the classical kind of pseudo reality problem which first and second-year students are given‍—‌that I haven't seen.

One month later he enrolled in a differential equations course ("mostly full of seniors") as well. When Einar Hille temporarily replaced the regular instructor, Gleason found Hille's style "unbelievably different ... He had a view of mathematics that was just vastly different ... That was a very important experience for me. So after that I took a lot of courses from Hille" including, in his sophomore year, graduate-level real analysis. "Starting with that course with Hille, I began to have some sense of what mathematics is about."

While at Yale he competed three times (1940, 1941 and 1942) in the recently founded William Lowell Putnam Mathematical Competition, always placing among the top five entrants in the country (making him the second three-time Putnam Fellow).

After the Japanese attacked Pearl Harbor during his senior year, Gleason applied for a commission in the US Navy, and on graduation joined the team working to break Japanese naval codes. (Others on this team included his future collaborator Robert E. Greenwood and Yale professor Marshall Hall Jr.) He also collaborated with British researchers attacking the German Enigma cipher; Alan Turing, who spent substantial time with Gleason while visiting Washington, called him "the brilliant young Yale graduate mathematician" in a report of his visit.

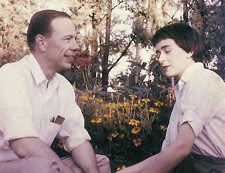
With Jean Berko, 1958

In 1946, at the recommendation of Navy colleague Donald Howard Menzel, Gleason was appointed a Junior Fellow at Harvard. An early goal of the Junior Fellows program was to allow young scholars showing extraordinary promise to sidestep the lengthy PhD process; four years later Harvard appointed Gleason an assistant professor of mathematics, though he was almost immediately recalled to Washington for cryptographic work related to the Korean War. He returned to Harvard in the fall of 1952, and soon after published the most important of his results on Hilbert's fifth problem (see below). Harvard awarded him tenure the following year.

In January 1959 he married Jean Berko whom he had met at a party featuring the music of Tom Lehrer. Berko, a psycholinguist, was a professor at Boston University for many years. They had three daughters.

In 1969 Gleason took the Hollis Chair of Mathematics and Natural Philosophy. Established in 1727, this is the oldest scientific endowed professorship in the US. He retired from Harvard in 1992 but remained active in service to Harvard (as chair of the Society of Fellows, for example) and to mathematics: in particular, promoting the Harvard Calculus Reform Project and working with the Massachusetts Board of Education.

He died on October 17, 2008 from complications following surgery.

== Teaching and education reform ==
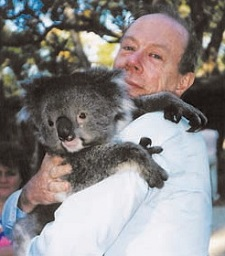
Australia, 1988

Gleason said he "always enjoyed helping other people with math"‍—‌a colleague said he "regarded teaching mathematics‍—‌like doing mathematics‍—‌as both important and also genuinely fun." At fourteen, during his brief attendance at Berkeley High School, he found himself not only bored with first-semester geometry, but also helping other students with their homework‍—‌including those taking the second half of the course, which he soon began auditing.

At Harvard he "regularly taught at every level", including administratively burdensome multisection courses. One class presented Gleason with a framed print of Picasso's Mother and Child in recognition of his care for them.

In 1964 he created "the first of the 'bridge' courses now ubiquitous for math majors, only twenty years before its time." Such a course is designed to teach new students, accustomed to rote learning of mathematics in secondary school, how to reason abstractly and construct mathematical proofs. That effort led to publication of his Fundamentals of Abstract Analysis, of which one reviewer wrote:

This is a most unusual book ... Every working mathematician of course knows the difference between a lifeless chain of formalized propositions and the "feeling" one has (or tries to get) of a mathematical theory, and will probably agree that helping the student to reach that "inside" view is the ultimate goal of mathematical education; but he will usually give up any attempt at successfully doing this except through oral teaching. The originality of the author is that he has tried to attain that goal in a textbook, and in the reviewer's opinion, he has succeeded remarkably well in this all but impossible task. Most readers will probably be delighted (as the reviewer has been) to find, page after page, painstaking discussions and explanations of standard mathematical and logical procedures, always written in the most felicitous style, which spares no effort to achieve the utmost clarity without falling into the vulgarity which so often mars such attempts.

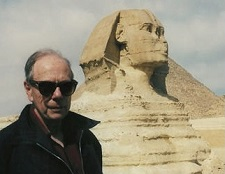
The Sphinx, 2001

But Gleason's "talent for exposition" did not always imply that the reader would be enlightened without effort of his own. Even in a wartime memo on the urgently important decryption of the German Enigma cipher, Gleason and his colleagues wrote:

The reader may wonder why so much is left to the reader. A book on swimming strokes may be nice to read, but one must practice the strokes while actually in the water before one can claim to be a swimmer. So if the reader desires to actually possess the knowledge for recovering wiring from a depth, let the reader get his paper and pencils, using perhaps four colors to avoid confusion in the connecting links, and go to work.

His notes and exercises on probability and statistics, drawn up for his lectures to code-breaking colleagues during the war (see below) remained in use in National Security Agency training for several decades; they were published openly in 1985.

In a 1964 Science article, Gleason wrote of an apparent paradox arising in attempts to explain mathematics to nonmathematicians:

It is notoriously difficult to convey the proper impression of the frontiers of mathematics to nonspecialists. Ultimately the difficulty stems from the fact that mathematics is an easier subject than the other sciences. Consequently, many of the important primary problems of the subject‍—‌that is, problems which can be understood by an intelligent outsider‍—‌have either been solved or carried to a point where an indirect approach is clearly required. The great bulk of pure mathematical research is concerned with secondary, tertiary, or higher-order problems, the very statement of which can hardly be understood until one has mastered a great deal of technical mathematics.

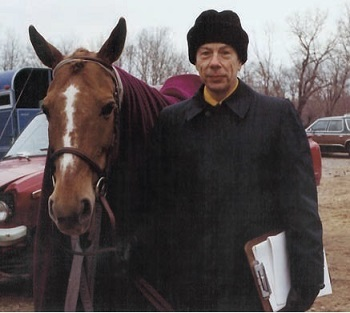
"With the inevitable clipboard under his arm", 1989

Gleason was the first chairman of the advisory committee of the School Mathematics Study Group, which helped define the New Math of the 1960s‍—‌ambitious changes in American elementary and high school mathematics teaching emphasizing understanding of concepts over rote algorithms. Gleason was "always interested in how people learn"; as part of the New Math effort he spent most mornings over several months with second-graders. Some years later he gave a talk in which he described his goal as having been:

to find out how much they could figure out for themselves, given appropriate activities and the right guidance. At the end of his talk, someone asked Andy whether he had ever worried that teaching math to little kids wasn't how faculty at research institutions should be spending their time. [His] quick and decisive response: "No, I didn't think about that at all. I had a ball!"

In 1986 he helped found the Calculus Consortium, which has published a successful and influential series of "calculus reform" textbooks for college and high school, on precalculus, calculus, and other areas. His "credo for this program as for all of his teaching was that the ideas should be based in equal parts of geometry for visualization of the concepts, computation for grounding in the real world, and algebraic manipulation for power." However, the program faced heavy criticism from the mathematics community for its omission of topics such as the mean value theorem, and for its perceived lack of mathematical rigor.

== Cryptanalysis work ==
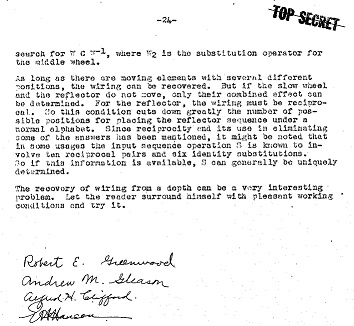
Report (1945) by Gleason and colleagues regarding the German Enigma. "The recovery of wiring from a depth can be a very interesting problem. Let the reader surround himself with pleasant working conditions and try it."

During World War II Gleason was part of OP-20-G, the U.S. Navy's signals intelligence and cryptanalysis group. One task of this group, in collaboration with British cryptographers at Bletchley Park such as Alan Turing, was to penetrate German Enigma machine communications networks. The British had great success with two of these networks, but the third, used for German-Japanese naval coordination, remained unbroken because of a faulty assumption that it employed a simplified version of Enigma. After OP-20-G's Marshall Hall observed that certain metadata in Berlin-to-Tokyo transmissions used letter sets disjoint from those used in Tokyo-to-Berlin metadata, Gleason hypothesized that the corresponding unencrypted letters sets were A-M (in one direction) and N-Z (in the other), then devised novel statistical tests by which he confirmed this hypothesis. The result was routine decryption of this third network by 1944. (This work also involved deeper mathematics related to permutation groups and the graph isomorphism problem.)

OP-20-G then turned to the Japanese navy's "Coral" cipher. A key tool for the attack on Coral was the "Gleason crutch", a form of Chernoff bound on tail distributions of sums of independent random variables. Gleason's classified work on this bound predated Chernoff's work by a decade.

Toward the end of the war he concentrated on documenting the work of OP-20-G and developing systems for training new cryptographers.

In 1950 Gleason returned to active duty for the Korean War, serving as a Lieutenant Commander in the Nebraska Avenue Complex (which much later became the home of the DHS Cyber Security Division). His cryptographic work from this period remains classified, but it is known that he recruited mathematicians and taught them cryptanalysis. He served on the advisory boards for the National Security Agency and the Institute for Defense Analyses, and he continued to recruit, and to advise the military on cryptanalysis, almost to the end of his life.

== Mathematics research ==
Gleason made fundamental contributions to widely varied areas of mathematics, including the theory of Lie groups, quantum mechanics, and combinatorics. According to Freeman Dyson's famous classification of mathematicians as being either birds or frogs, Gleason was a frog: he worked as a problem solver rather than a visionary formulating grand theories.

=== Hilbert's fifth problem ===
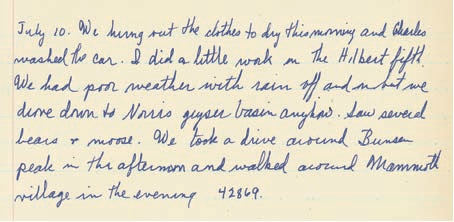
Journal entry (1947): "July 10. We hung out the clothes to dry this morning and Charles washed the car. I did a little work on the Hilbert fifth."

In 1900 David Hilbert posed 23 problems he felt would be central to next century of mathematics research. Hilbert's fifth problem concerns the characterization of Lie groups by their actions on topological spaces: to what extent does their topology provide information sufficient to determine their geometry?

The "restricted" version of Hilbert's fifth problem (solved by Gleason) asks, more specifically, whether every locally Euclidean topological group is a Lie group. That is, if a group G has the structure of a topological manifold, can that structure be strengthened to a real analytic structure, so that within any neighborhood of an element of G, the group law is defined by a convergent power series, and so that overlapping neighborhoods have compatible power series definitions? Prior to Gleason's work, special cases of the problem had been solved by L. E. J. Brouwer, John von Neumann, Lev Pontryagin, and Garrett Birkhoff, among others.

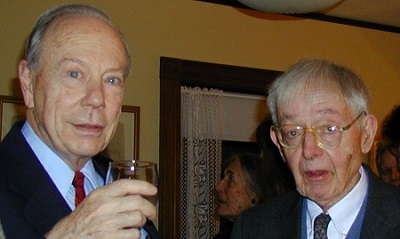
With his mentor George Mackey at Alice Mackey's 80th birthday (2000).

Gleason's interest in the fifth problem began in the late 1940s, sparked by a course he took from George Mackey. In 1949 he published a paper introducing the "no small subgroups" property of Lie groups (the existence of a neighborhood of the identity within which no nontrivial subgroup exists) that would eventually be crucial to its solution. His 1952 paper on the subject, together with a paper published concurrently by Deane Montgomery and Leo Zippin, solves affirmatively the restricted version of Hilbert's fifth problem, showing that indeed every locally Euclidean group is a Lie group. Gleason's contribution was to prove that this is true when G has the no small subgroups property; Montgomery and Zippin showed every locally Euclidean group has this property. As Gleason told the story, the key insight of his proof was to apply the fact that monotonic functions are differentiable almost everywhere. On finding the solution, he took a week of leave to write it up, and it was printed in the Annals of Mathematics alongside the paper of Montgomery and Zippin; another paper a year later by Hidehiko Yamabe removed some technical side conditions from Gleason's proof. (Note: In a 1959 description of his own research, Gleason simply said that he had written "a number of papers" which "contributed substantially" to the solution of Hilbert's Fifth.)

The "unrestricted" version of Hilbert's fifth problem, closer to Hilbert's original formulation, considers both a locally Euclidean group G and another manifold M on which G has a continuous action. Hilbert asked whether, in this case, M and the action of G could be given a real analytic structure. It was quickly realized that the answer was negative, after which attention centered on the restricted problem. However, with some additional smoothness assumptions on G and M, it might yet be possible to prove the existence of a real analytic structure on the group action. The Hilbert–Smith conjecture, still unsolved, encapsulates the remaining difficulties of this case.

=== Quantum mechanics ===
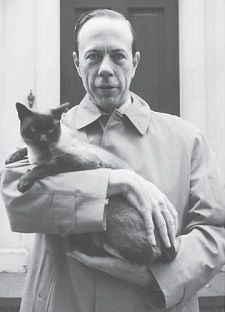
With family cat Fred about 1966

The Born rule states that an observable property of a quantum system is defined by a Hermitian operator on a separable Hilbert space, that the only observable values of the property are the eigenvalues of the operator, and that the probability of the system being observed in a particular eigenvalue is the square of the absolute value of the complex number obtained by projecting the state vector (a point in the Hilbert space) onto the corresponding eigenvector. George Mackey had asked whether Born's rule is a necessary consequence of a particular set of axioms for quantum mechanics, and more specifically whether every measure on the lattice of projections of a Hilbert space can be defined by a positive operator with unit trace. Though Richard Kadison proved this was false for two-dimensional Hilbert spaces, Gleason's theorem (published 1957) shows it to be true for higher dimensions.

Gleason's theorem implies the nonexistence of certain types of hidden variable theories for quantum mechanics, strengthening a previous argument of John von Neumann. Von Neumann had claimed to show that hidden variable theories were impossible, but (as Grete Hermann pointed out) his demonstration made an assumption that quantum systems obeyed a form of additivity of expectation for noncommuting operators that might not hold a priori. In 1966, John Stewart Bell showed that Gleason's theorem could be used to remove this extra assumption from von Neumann's argument.

=== Ramsey theory ===
The Greenwood–Gleason graph

The Ramsey number R(k,l) is the smallest number r such that every graph with at least r vertices contains either a k-vertex clique or an l-vertex independent set. Ramsey numbers require enormous effort to compute; when max(k,l) ≥ 3 only finitely many of them are known precisely, and an exact computation of R(6,6) is believed to be out of reach. In 1953, the calculation of R(3,3) was given as a question in the Putnam Competition. In 1955, motivated by this problem, Gleason and his co-author Robert E. Greenwood made significant progress in the computation of Ramsey numbers with their proof that R(3,4) = 9, R(3,5) = 14, and R(4,4) = 18. Since then, only five more of these values have been found. In the same 1955 paper, Greenwood and Gleason also computed the multicolor Ramsey number R(3,3,3): the smallest number r such that, if a complete graph on r vertices has its edges colored with three colors, then it necessarily contains a monochromatic triangle. As they showed, R(3,3,3) = 17; this remains the only nontrivial multicolor Ramsey number whose exact value is known. As part of their proof, they used an algebraic construction to show that a 16-vertex complete graph can be decomposed into three disjoint copies of a triangle-free 5-regular graph with 16 vertices and 40 edges (sometimes called the Greenwood–Gleason graph).

Ronald Graham writes that the paper by Greenwood and Gleason "is now recognized as a classic in the development of Ramsey theory". In the late 1960s, Gleason became the doctoral advisor of Joel Spencer, who also became known for his contributions to Ramsey theory.

=== Coding theory ===
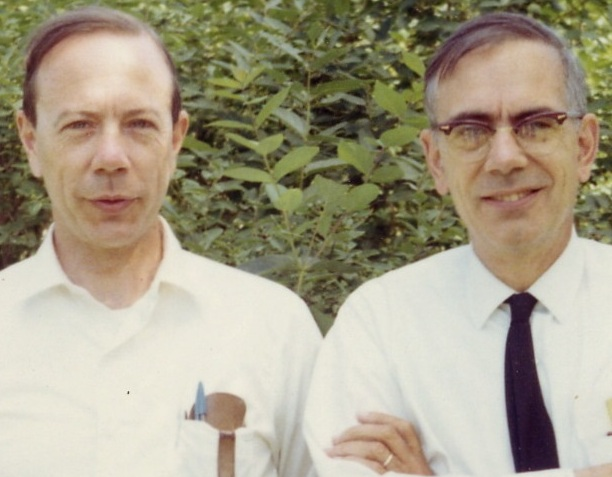
With his brother, linguist Henry Allan Gleason Jr., in Toronto, 1969

Gleason published few contributions to coding theory, but they were influential ones, and included "many of the seminal ideas and early results" in algebraic coding theory. During the 1950s and 1960s, he attended monthly meetings on coding theory with Vera Pless and others at the Air Force Cambridge Research Laboratory. Pless, who had previously worked in abstract algebra but became one of the world's leading experts in coding theory during this time, writes that "these monthly meetings were what I lived for." She frequently posed her mathematical problems to Gleason and was often rewarded with a quick and insightful response.

The Gleason–Prange theorem is named after Gleason's work with AFCRL researcher Eugene Prange; it was originally published in a 1964 AFCRL research report by H. F. Mattson Jr. and E. F. Assmus Jr. It concerns the quadratic residue code of order n, extended by adding a single parity check bit. This "remarkable theorem" shows that this code is highly symmetric, having the projective linear group PSL_{2}(n) as a subgroup of its symmetries.

Gleason is the namesake of the Gleason polynomials, a system of polynomials that generate the weight enumerators of linear codes. These polynomials take a particularly simple form for self-dual codes: in this case there are just two of them, the two bivariate polynomials x^{2} + y^{2} and x^{8} + 14x^{2}y^{2} + y^{8}. Gleason's student Jessie MacWilliams continued Gleason's work in this area, proving a relationship between the weight enumerators of codes and their duals that has become known as the MacWilliams identity.

In this area, he also did pioneering work in experimental mathematics, performing computer experiments in 1960. This work studied the average distance to a codeword, for a code related to the Berlekamp switching game.

=== Other areas ===
Gleason founded the theory of Dirichlet algebras, and made other mathematical contributions including work on finite geometry and on the enumerative combinatorics of permutations. (In 1959 he wrote that his research "sidelines" included "an intense interest in combinatorial problems.") As well, he was not above publishing research in more elementary mathematics, such as the derivation of the set of polygons that can be constructed with compass, straightedge, and an angle trisector.

== Awards and honors ==
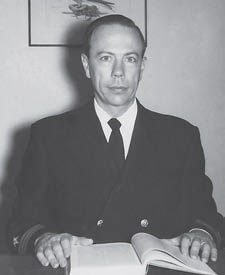
In Naval Reserve uniform, 1960s

In 1952 Gleason was awarded the American Association for the Advancement of Science's Newcomb Cleveland Prize for his work on Hilbert's fifth problem. He was elected to the National Academy of Sciences and the American Philosophical Society, was a Fellow of the American Academy of Arts and Sciences, and belonged to the Société Mathématique de France.

In 1981 and 1982 he was president of the American Mathematical Society, and at various times held numerous other posts in professional and scholarly organizations, including chairmanship of the Harvard Department of Mathematics. In 1986 he chaired the organizing committee for the International Congress of Mathematicians in Berkeley, California, and was president of the Congress.

In 1996 the Harvard Society of Fellows held a special symposium honoring Gleason on his retirement after seven years as its chairman; that same year, the Mathematics Association of America awarded him the Yueh-Gin Gung and Dr. Charles Y. Hu Distinguished Service to Mathematics Award. A past president of the Association wrote:

In thinking about, and admiring, Andy Gleason's career, your natural reference is the total profession of a mathematician: designing and teaching courses, advising on education at all levels, doing research, consulting for the users of mathematics, acting as a leader of the profession, cultivating mathematical talent, and serving one's institution. Andy Gleason is that rare individual who has done all of these superbly.

After his death a 32-page collection of essays in the Notices of the American Mathematical Society recalled "the life and work of [this] eminent American mathematician", calling him "one of the quiet giants of twentieth-century mathematics, the consummate professor dedicated to scholarship, teaching, and service in equal measure."

== Selected publications ==
Research papers

- Gleason, A. M. (1952), "One-parameter subgroups and Hilbert's fifth problem" (PDF), Proceedings of the International Congress of Mathematicians, Cambridge, Mass., 1950, Vol. 2, Providence, R. I.: American Mathematical Society, pp. 451–452, MR 0043788, archived from the original (PDF) on 2014-12-14
- —— (1956), "Finite Fano planes", American Journal of Mathematics, 78 (4): 797–807, doi:10.2307/2372469, JSTOR 2372469, MR 0082684.
- —— (1957), "Measures on the closed subspaces of a Hilbert space", Journal of Mathematics and Mechanics, 6 (4): 885–893, doi:10.1512/iumj.1957.6.56050, MR 0096113.
- —— (1958), "Projective topological spaces", Illinois Journal of Mathematics, 2 (4A): 482–489, doi:10.1215/ijm/1255454110, MR 0121775, Zbl 0083.17401.
- —— (1967), "A characterization of maximal ideals", Journal d'Analyse Mathématique, 19: 171–172, doi:10.1007/bf02788714, MR 0213878, S2CID 121062823.
- —— (1971), "Weight polynomials of self-dual codes and the MacWilliams identities", Actes du Congrès International des Mathématiciens (Nice, 1970), Tome 3, Paris: Gauthier-Villars, pp. 211–215, MR 0424391.
- Greenwood, R. E.; Gleason, A. M. (1955), "Combinatorial relations and chromatic graphs", Canadian Journal of Mathematics, 7: 1–7, doi:10.4153/CJM-1955-001-4, MR 0067467, S2CID 124255697.

Books

- Gleason, Andrew M. (1966), Fundamentals of Abstract Analysis, Addison-Wesley Publishing Co., Reading, Mass.-London-Don Mills, Ont., MR 0202509. Corrected reprint, Boston: Jones and Bartlett, 1991, MR 1140189.
- ——; Greenwood, Robert E.; Kelly, Leroy Milton (1980), The William Lowell Putnam Mathematical Competition: Problems and Solutions 1938–1964, Mathematical Association of America, ISBN 978-0-88385-462-4, MR 0588757.
- ——; Penney, Walter F.; Wyllys, Ronald E. (1985), Elementary Course in Probability for the Cryptanalyst, Laguna Hills, CA: Aegean Park Press. Unclassified reprint of a book originally published in 1957 by the National Security Agency, Office of Research and Development, Mathematical Research Division.
- ——; Hughes-Hallett, Deborah (1994), Calculus, Wiley. Since its original publications this book has been extended to many different editions and variations with additional co-authors.

Film

- Gleason, Andrew M. (1966), Nim and other oriented-graph games, Mathematical Association of America. 63 minutes, black & white. Produced by Richard G. Long and directed by Allan Hinderstein.

== See also ==
- Bell's critique of von Neumann's proof
- Pierpont prime, a class of prime numbers conjectured by Gleason to be infinite
