= Henry Allan Gleason =

Henry Allan Gleason may refer to:

- Henry A. Gleason (1882–1975), American ecologist, botanist and taxonomist
- Henry Allan Gleason (linguist) (1917–2007), his son, linguist
