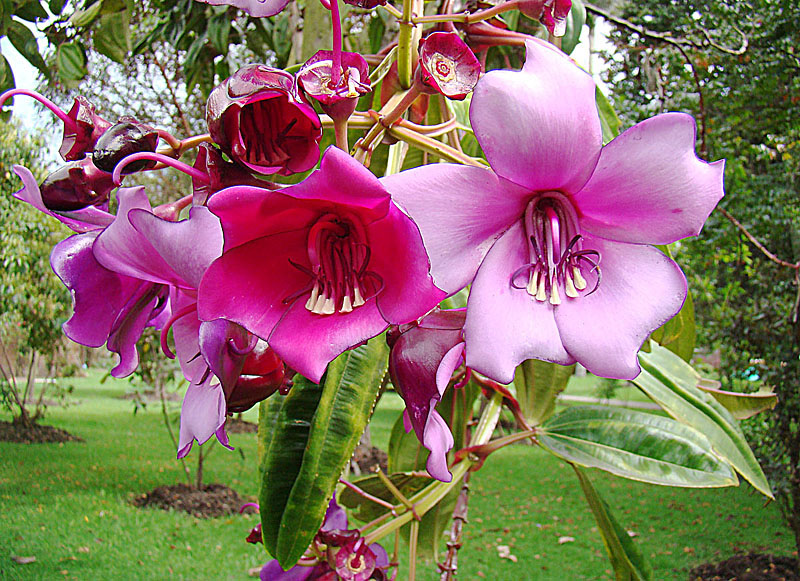
- Meriania nobilis

Scientific classification
- Kingdom: Plantae
- Clade: Tracheophytes
- Clade: Angiosperms
- Clade: Eudicots
- Clade: Rosids
- Order: Myrtales
- Family: Melastomataceae
- Genus: Meriania; Sw.

= Meriania =

Genus of flowering plants

Meriania is a genus of flowering plants in the family Melastomataceae. There are about 93 species distributed from Mexico to Brazil and the Antilles.

Plants of this genus are woody shrubs or trees with large flowers and capsules. The genus was named in honor of naturalist and scientific illustrator Maria Sibylla Merian.

Species include:

- Meriania acostae Wurdack
- Meriania almedae Wurdack
- Meriania ampla Wurdack
- Meriania amplexicaulis Wurdack
- Meriania barbosae
- Meriania campii Wurdack
- Meriania costata Wurdack
- Meriania crassiramis (Naudin) Wurdack
- Meriania cuneifolia Gleason
- Meriania denticulata (Gleason) Wurdack
- Meriania drakei (Cogn.) Wurdack
- Meriania fantastica
- Meriania franciscana
- Meriania furvanthera Wurdack
- Meriania glazioviana Cogn.
- Meriania grandiflora (Standl.) Almeda
- Meriania kirkbridei Wurdack
- Meriania leucantha (Sw.) Sw.
- Meriania loxensis Gleason
- Meriania maguirei Wurdack
- Meriania panamensis Woods. & Schery
- Meriania pastazana Wurdack
- Meriania peltata L.Uribe
- Meriania pichinchensis Wurdack
- Meriania rigida (Benth.) Triana
- Meriania stellata (Gleason) Wurdack
- Meriania versicolor L.Uribe
