= Andrew Mattei =

American winemaker

Andrew Mattei (c. 1848 – 1931) was a Swiss-Italian winemaker who immigrated to Fresno, California, where he became the owner of a large winery.

Mattei came to Fresno County, California, in approximately 1890, and founded the Mattei Winery in 1893. His vineyard grew from 80 acres at its start to 1,200 acres in 1910. By 1915, his winery was valued at ten million dollars and was reported as "among the largest in the state"; it became the largest in the country prior to Prohibition. As well as wine, the winery also sold grape syrup and brandy.

Mattei's children disliked the wine business and so, fearing his company would be dissolved after his death, Mattei commissioned a 12-story office building in Fresno to bear his name; it eventually became the Guarantee Savings Building. Once again called the Mattei Building, it remains the 7th tallest building in Fresno. Despite Mattei's fears, the Mattei Winery and its Mattevista Wines brand name continued to operate after the repeal of Prohibition, and lasted until 1962, when it was sold to Guild Wineries.

Mattei's daughter Eleanor Theodolinda Mattei married botanist Henry Gleason; their children were mathematician Andrew Mattei Gleason and linguist Henry Allan Gleason.
