= Cuatrecasanthus flexipappus =

Conservation status
- Endangered (IUCN 3.1)

Scientific classification
- Kingdom: Plantae
- Clade: Tracheophytes
- Clade: Angiosperms
- Clade: Eudicots
- Clade: Asterids
- Order: Asterales
- Family: Asteraceae
- Genus: Cuatrecasanthus
- Species: C. flexipappus

Binomial name
- Cuatrecasanthus flexipappus (Gleason) H.Rob.

Synonyms
- Vernonia flexipappa Gleason

Species of flowering plant

Cuatrecasanthus flexipappus is a species of flowering plant in the family Asteraceae. It is a shrub or tree found only in Ecuador. Its natural habitat is subtropical or tropical moist montane forests. It is threatened by habitat loss.

The species was first described as Vernonia flexipappa by Henry A. Gleason in 1925. In 1989 Harold E. Robinson placed the species in genus Cuatrecasanthus as C. flexipappus.
