= Sandemania =

Scientific classification
- Kingdom: Plantae
- Clade: Tracheophytes
- Clade: Angiosperms
- Clade: Eudicots
- Clade: Rosids
- Order: Myrtales
- Family: Melastomataceae
- Genus: Sandemania; Gleason
- Species: S. hoehnei

Binomial name
- Sandemania hoehnei (Cogn.) Wurdack

Synonyms
- Comolia Cogn. ex Hoehne; Leandra cogniauxii Ule; Leandra purpurascens Cogn.; Sandemania cogniauxii (Ule) Wurdack; Sandemania glandulosa Wurdack; Sandemania lilacina Gleason

Species of flowering plant

Sandemania is a monotypic genus of flowering plants belonging to the family Melastomataceae. The only known species is Sandemania hoehnei.

Its native range is southern Tropical America. It is found in Bolivia, Brazil (northern and west-central), Peru and Venezuela.

The genus name of Sandemania is in honour of Christopher Albert Walter Sandeman (1882–1951), an English botanist and traveler. He collected in South America. The Latin specific epithet of hoehnei refers to Frederico Carlos Hoehne (1882–1959), a Brazilian botanist. The genus was first described and published in Bull. Misc. Inform. Kew 1939, onpage 480 in 1939. The species was then first published in Phytologia Vol.20 on page 370 in 1970.
