= Meriania glazioviana =

Scientific classification
- Kingdom: Plantae
- Clade: Tracheophytes
- Clade: Angiosperms
- Clade: Eudicots
- Clade: Rosids
- Order: Myrtales
- Family: Melastomataceae
- Genus: Meriania
- Species: M. glazioviana

Binomial name
- Meriania glazioviana Cogn.

Species of plant

Meriania glazioviana is a species of flowering plant in the family Melastomataceae. It was first described by Célestin Alfred Cogniaux.

This species is distributed in the Rio de Janeiro region of south-eastern Brazil.

There are no listed subspecies of this plant.
