= Meriania crassiramis =

Conservation status
- Near Threatened (IUCN 2.3)

Scientific classification
- Kingdom: Plantae
- Clade: Tracheophytes
- Clade: Angiosperms
- Clade: Eudicots
- Clade: Rosids
- Order: Myrtales
- Family: Melastomataceae
- Genus: Meriania
- Species: M. crassiramis

Binomial name
- Meriania crassiramis (Naudin) Wurdack

Species of flowering plant

Meriania crassiramis is a species of plant in the family Melastomataceae. It is found in Guyana and Venezuela.
