= Daniel I. A. Cohen =

American computer scientist (born 1946)

- Born: 1946 (age 79–80)
- Occupations: Mathematician, computer scientist, professor emeritus
- Years active: 1967-present?
- Employer: Hunter College

Daniel Isaac Aryeh Cohen (born 1946) is an American mathematician and computer scientist who is now a professor emeritus at Hunter College.

Cohen earned a bachelor's degree in mathematics from Princeton University in 1967 and already as an undergraduate published a research paper about Sperner's lemma, which he learned about from Hans Rademacher. He completed his doctorate in 1975 from Harvard University under the joint supervision of Andrew M. Gleason and Gian-Carlo Rota. He was a mathematician at Hunter College in 1981 when the computer science department was founded, and became one of five initial computer science professors there.

Cohen is the author of the textbooks Basic Techniques of Combinatorial Theory (John Wiley & Sons, 1979) and Introduction to Computer Theory (John Wiley & Sons, 1986; 2nd ed., 1996).

An undergraduate award for a graduating senior at Hunter College, the Daniel I.A. Cohen Prize for Academic Excellence in Theoretical Computer Science, was named after Cohen.
