= Sylvester–Gallai configuration =

Points with no line through exactly two points

In geometry, a Sylvester–Gallai configuration consists of a finite subset of the points of a projective space with the property that the line through any two of the points in the subset also passes through at least one other point of the subset.

Instead of defining Sylvester–Gallai configurations as subsets of the points of a projective space, they may be defined as abstract incidence structures of points and lines, satisfying the properties that, for every pair of points, the structure includes exactly one line containing the pair and that every line contains at least three points. In this more general form they are also called Sylvester–Gallai designs. A closely related concept is a Sylvester matroid, a matroid with the same property as a Sylvester–Gallai configuration of having no two-point lines.

== Real and complex embeddability ==
In the Euclidean plane, the real projective plane, higher-dimensional Euclidean spaces or real projective spaces, or spaces with coordinates in an ordered field, the Sylvester–Gallai theorem shows that the only possible Sylvester–Gallai configurations are one-dimensional: they consist of three or more collinear points. Jean-Pierre Serre (1966) was inspired by this fact and by the example of the Hesse configuration to ask whether, in spaces with complex-number coordinates, every Sylvester–Gallai configuration is at most two-dimensional. Erdős (1980) repeated the question. Kelly (1986) answered Serre's question affirmatively; Elkies, Pretorius & Swanepoel (2006) simplified Kelly's proof, and proved analogously that in spaces with quaternion coordinates, all Sylvester–Gallai configurations must lie within a three-dimensional subspace.

== Projective configurations ==
Motzkin (1951) studied the projective configurations that are also Sylvester–Gallai configurations; a projective configuration has the additional requirement that every two points have equal numbers of lines through them and every two lines contain equal numbers of points. The Sylvester–Gallai configurations include, for instance, the affine and projective spaces of any dimension defined over finite fields, and these are all also projective configurations.

Every projective configuration can be given a notation (p_{a} ℓ_{b}), where p is the number of points, ℓ the number of lines, a the number of lines per point, and b the number of points per line, satisfying the equation pa = ℓb. Motzkin observed that, for these parameters to define a Sylvester–Gallai design, it is necessary that b > 2, that p < ℓ (for any set of non-collinear points in a projective space determines at least as many lines as points) and that they also obey the additional equation

$$\binom{p}{2}=\binom{b}{2}\ell.$$

For, the left hand side of the equation is the number of pairs of points, and the right hand side is the number of pairs that are covered by lines of the configuration.

Sylvester–Gallai designs that are also projective configurations are the same thing as Steiner systems with parameters ST(2,b,p).

Motzkin listed several examples of small configurations of this type:

- 7_{3}7_{3}, the parameters of the Fano plane, the projective plane over a field of two elements.
- 9_{4}12_{3}, the parameters of the Hesse configuration. This is the affine plane over a three-element field, and can also be realized with complex-number coordinates, as the set of inflection points of an elliptic curve.
- 13_{4}13_{4}, the parameters of the projective plane over a three-element field.
- 13_{6}26_{3}, the parameters of the two 13-element Steiner triple systems.
- 15_{7}35_{3}, the parameters of a three-dimensional projective space over a two-element field and of 79 other Steiner triple systems
- 16_{5}20_{4}, the parameters of the affine plane over a four-element field.
- 21_{5}21_{5}, the parameters of the projective plane over a four-element field.
- 25_{6}30_{5}, the parameters of the affine plane over a five-element field.

Boros, Füredi & Kelly (1989) and Bokowski & Richter-Gebert (1992) studied alternative geometric representations of Sylvester–Gallai designs, in which the points of the design are represented by skew lines in four-dimensional space and each line of the design is represented by a hyperplane. Both the seven-point and 13-point projective planes have representations of this type.

== Other examples ==
Kelly & Nwankpa (1973) more generally classified all non-collinear Sylvester–Gallai configurations and Sylvester–Gallai designs over at most 14 points. They include a unique design with ten points; in it, some points are contained in three four-point lines while other points belong to three three-point lines and one four-point line. There is also a unique 11-point Sylvester–Gallai design, two different 12-point designs, and four irregular 13-point designs. For 14 points, they found that again there was only one possible Sylvester–Gallai design.
