= Eberhard Melchior =

German mathematician (born 1912)

Eberhard Melchior (12 November 1912 – July 11, 1956) was a German mathematician who provided the first proof of Sylvester's line problem in 1940. He also discovered the related inequality now named after him.

Melchior was born in Dresden on 12 November 1912. He studied at the University of Göttingen and at the Dresden University of Technology. He obtained his Ph.D. at the University of Berlin on 2 June 1937 with a thesis on a problem on the theory of configurations, advised by Ludwig Bieberbach.
