= Meriania versicolor =

Conservation status
- Endangered (IUCN 3.1)

Scientific classification
- Kingdom: Plantae
- Clade: Tracheophytes
- Clade: Angiosperms
- Clade: Eudicots
- Clade: Rosids
- Order: Myrtales
- Family: Melastomataceae
- Genus: Meriania
- Species: M. versicolor

Binomial name
- Meriania versicolor L.Uribe

Species of flowering plant

Meriania versicolor is a species of plant in the family Melastomataceae. It is endemic to Colombia.
