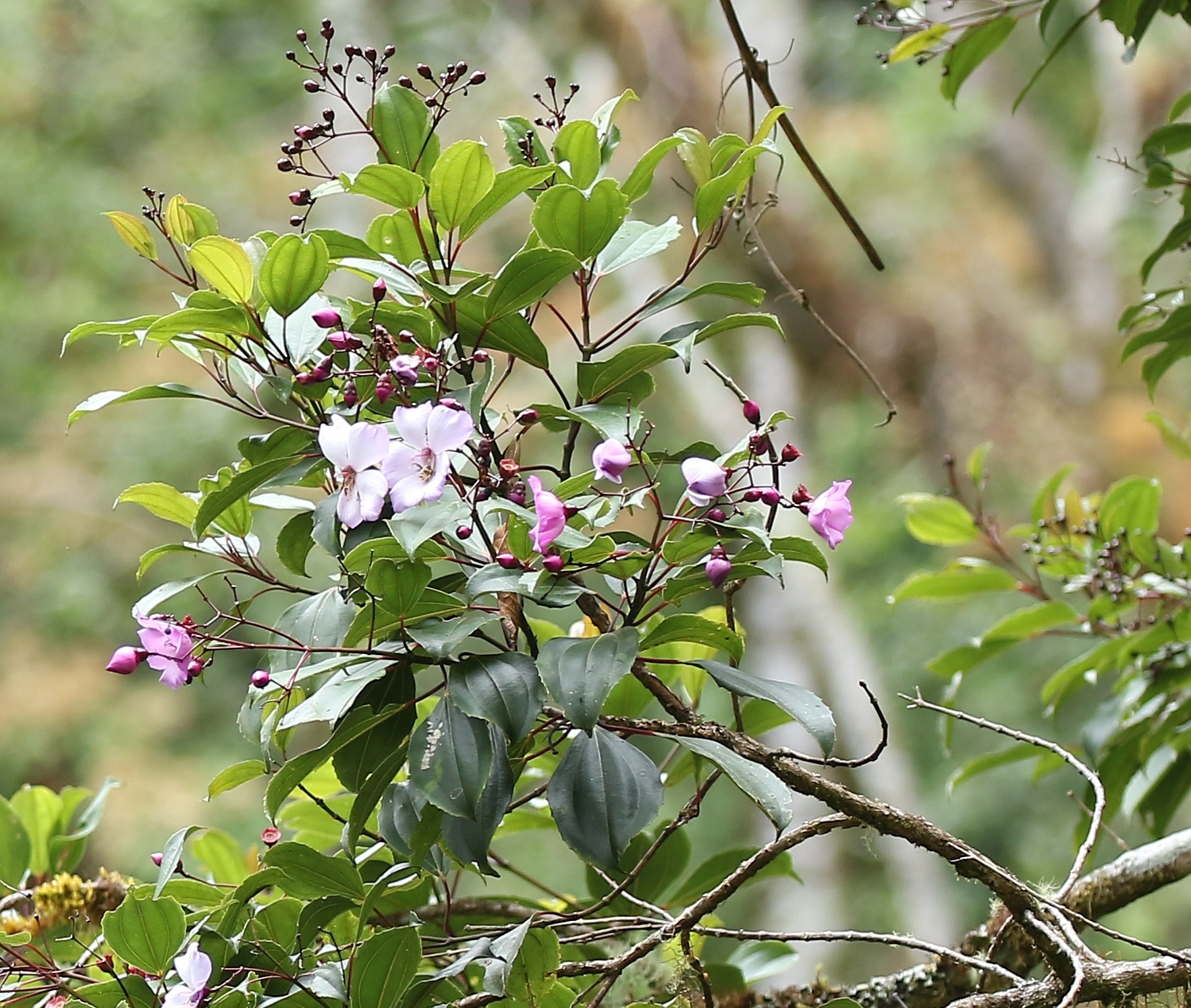

Conservation status
- Endangered (IUCN 2.3)

Scientific classification
- Kingdom: Plantae
- Clade: Tracheophytes
- Clade: Angiosperms
- Clade: Eudicots
- Clade: Rosids
- Order: Myrtales
- Family: Melastomataceae
- Genus: Meriania
- Species: M. panamensis

Binomial name
- Meriania panamensis Woods. & Schery

= Meriania panamensis =

Species of flowering plant

Meriania panamensis is a species of plant in the family Melastomataceae. It is endemic to Panama. It is threatened by habitat lossand was listed as Endangered in 1998. As of 2023, its measured population had increased and it was listed as Vulnerable.
