= Meriania drakei =

Conservation status
- Least Concern (IUCN 3.1)

Scientific classification
- Kingdom: Plantae
- Clade: Tracheophytes
- Clade: Angiosperms
- Clade: Eudicots
- Clade: Rosids
- Order: Myrtales
- Family: Melastomataceae
- Genus: Meriania
- Species: M. drakei

Binomial name
- Meriania drakei (Cogn.) Wurdack

Synonyms
- Axinaea drakei Cogn. Meriania drakei subsp. chontalensis Wurdack

Species of flowering plant

Meriania drakei is a species of plant in the family Melastomataceae. It is endemic to Ecuador. Its natural habitat is subtropical or tropical moist montane forests.
