= Meriania grandiflora =

Conservation status
- Vulnerable (IUCN 2.3)

Scientific classification
- Kingdom: Plantae
- Clade: Tracheophytes
- Clade: Angiosperms
- Clade: Eudicots
- Clade: Rosids
- Order: Myrtales
- Family: Melastomataceae
- Genus: Meriania
- Species: M. grandiflora

Binomial name
- Meriania grandiflora (Standl.) Almeda

Species of flowering plant

Meriania grandiflora is a species of plant in the family Melastomataceae. It is found in Costa Rica and Panama. It is threatened by habitat loss.
