= Meriania leucantha =

Conservation status
- Near Threatened (IUCN 2.3)

Scientific classification
- Kingdom: Plantae
- Clade: Tracheophytes
- Clade: Angiosperms
- Clade: Eudicots
- Clade: Rosids
- Order: Myrtales
- Family: Melastomataceae
- Genus: Meriania
- Species: M. leucantha

Binomial name
- Meriania leucantha (Sw.) Sw.

Species of flowering plant

Meriania leucantha is a species of plant in the family Melastomataceae. It is endemic to Jamaica.
