= Cuatrecasanthus =

Scientific classification
- Kingdom: Plantae
- Clade: Tracheophytes
- Clade: Angiosperms
- Clade: Eudicots
- Clade: Asterids
- Order: Asterales
- Family: Asteraceae
- Subfamily: Vernonioideae
- Tribe: Vernonieae
- Genus: Cuatrecasanthus; H.Rob.

Genus of flowering plants

Cuatrecasanthus is a genus of South American flowering plants in the family Asteraceae. It includes six species native to Ecuador and Peru.

== Species ==
Six species are accepted.

- Cuatrecasanthus flexipappus (Gleason) H.Rob. - Ecuador
- Cuatrecasanthus giannasii (Stutts) H.Rob. & V.A.Funk – southeastern Ecuador
- Cuatrecasanthus jelskii (Hieron.) H.Rob. - Peru
- Cuatrecasanthus kingii H.Rob. & V.A.Funk – Ecuador
- Cuatrecasanthus lanceolatus H.Rob. & V.A.Funk – Ecuador
- Cuatrecasanthus sandemanii (H.Rob.) H.Rob. - Peru
