= Meriania peltata =

Conservation status
- Endangered (IUCN 2.3)

Scientific classification
- Kingdom: Plantae
- Clade: Tracheophytes
- Clade: Angiosperms
- Clade: Eudicots
- Clade: Rosids
- Order: Myrtales
- Family: Melastomataceae
- Genus: Meriania
- Species: M. peltata

Binomial name
- Meriania peltata L.Uribe

Species of flowering plant

Meriania peltata is a species of plant in the family Melastomataceae. It is endemic to Colombia.
