= Vera Pless =

American mathematician (1931–2020)

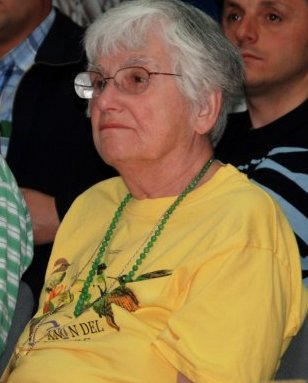
Vera Pless

Vera Pless (nee Stepen; March 5, 1931 – March 2, 2020) was an American mathematician who specialized in combinatorics and coding theory. She was professor emerita at the University of Illinois at Chicago.

== Biography ==
Vera Stepen was born on Chicago's west side to a Russian Jewish immigrant family. As a teenager, she was more interested in playing the cello than in mathematics, but she left high school two years early to go to the University of Chicago, and finished her studies there in three years.

Inspired by Irving Kaplansky to study abstract algebra, she stayed at the university for a master's degree, which she earned in 1952 not long after marrying her husband, a high-energy experimental physicist.

She began working in physics at the University of Chicago, but soon won a fellowship to study at Northwestern University. Her husband became a professor at the Massachusetts Institute of Technology; Pless moved with him to Massachusetts, where she completed her doctorate from Northwestern in 1957 under the supervision of Kaplansky's student Alex F. T. W. Rosenberg, soon before the birth of her first child.

Two years later, bored with being a stay-at-home mother, Pless began teaching courses at Boston University, and a few years later began searching for a full-time job. Unable to obtain an academic position, she took a position at the Air Force Cambridge Research Laboratory in Massachusetts. where she began working on error-correcting codes.

During this time she helped to found an organization called Women in Science and Engineering, and at one point was president. She stayed at AFCRL from 1963 until 1972; a regular visitor and inspiration during this time was Harvard mathematician and cryptographer Andrew Gleason.

When the Mansfield amendment banned the military from performing basic research, she moved to the Massachusetts Institute of Technology, where she worked as a research associate for Project MAC.

She returned to Chicago in 1975 as a full professor of Mathematics, Statistics and Computer Science at the University of Illinois at Chicago. Her husband and youngest son had remained in the Boston area, and five years after the move, she and her husband divorced.

She retired in 2006 and died at her home in Oak Park, Illinois on March 2, 2020 at the age of 88.

== Awards and honors ==
In 2012 she became a fellow of the American Mathematical Society.

== Selected publications ==
- Pless, Vera (1982). Introduction to the Theory of Error-Correcting Codes. Wiley-Interscience Series in Discrete Mathematics. John Wiley & Sons. ISBN 0-471-08684-3. 2nd ed., 1989; 3rd ed., 1998.
- Pless, Vera; Richard A. Brualdi; WC Huffman (November 1998). Handbook of Coding Theory. North-Holland Mathematical Library. North-Holland. ISBN 978-0-444-81472-2.
- Pless, Vera; WC Huffman (August 2003). Fundamentals of Error-Correcting Codes. Cambridge University Press. ISBN 978-0-521-78280-7.
- Pless, Vera; Janet Beissinger (May 2006). The Cryptoclub: Using Mathematics to Make and Break Secret Codes. A.K. Peters, Ltd. ISBN 1-56881-223-X.
