= William Arthur Kirk =

American mathematician (1936–2022)

William Arthur ("Art") Kirk (October 3, 1936 – October 20, 2022) was an American mathematician. His research interests include nonlinear functional analysis, the geometry of Banach spaces and metric spaces. In particular, he made notable contributions to the fixed point theory of metric spaces; also known as metric fixed point theory. He is one of the two namesakes of the Caristi-Kirk fixed point theorem of 1976. He is also known for the Kirk theorem of 1964.

== Biography ==
Kirk was born in Montour Falls, New York and studied at DePauw University, where he graduated with a Bachelor's degree in 1958. He went on to complete his PhD, entitled "Metrization of Surface Curvature", at the University of Missouri in August 1962 under the supervision of Leonard Blumenthal. He then became an assistant professor of mathematics at the University of California, Riverside from 1962 to 1967. Starting in 1967 he worked at the University of Iowa, as a full professor of mathematics since 1971 and as department chair from 1985 to 1991.

He held an honorary doctorate from Maria Curie-Skłodowska University, an institution which was an early centre of study for the fixed point theory of metric spaces.

He died on October 20th, 2022.

== Books ==
- Goebel, Kazimierz; Kirk, W. A. (1990). Topics in metric fixed point theory. Cambridge studies in advanced mathematics. Cambridge ; New York: Cambridge University Press. ISBN 978-0-521-38289-2.
- Kirk, William A.; Sims, Brailey, eds. (2001). Handbook of Metric Fixed Point Theory. Dordrecht: Springer Netherlands. doi:10.1007/978-94-017-1748-9. ISBN 978-90-481-5733-4.
- Khamsi, Mohamed A.; Kirk, William A. (2001). An introduction to metric spaces and fixed point theory. Pure and applied mathematics. New York: John Wiley. ISBN 978-1-118-03132-2.
- Kirk, William; Shahzad, Naseer (2014). Fixed Point Theory in Distance Spaces. Cham: Springer International Publishing. doi:10.1007/978-3-319-10927-5. ISBN 978-3-319-10926-8.
