= Caristi fixed-point theorem =

In mathematics, the Caristi fixed-point theorem (also known as the Caristi–Kirk fixed-point theorem) generalizes the Banach fixed-point theorem for maps of a complete metric space into itself. Caristi's fixed-point theorem modifies the $\varepsilon$-variational principle of Ekeland (1974, 1979). The conclusion of Caristi's theorem is equivalent to metric completeness, as proved by Weston (1977). The original result is due to the mathematicians James Caristi and William Arthur Kirk.

Caristi fixed-point theorem can be applied to derive other classical fixed-point results, and also to prove the existence of bounded solutions of a functional equation.

== Statement of the theorem ==
Let $(X, d)$ be a complete metric space. Let $T : X \to X$ and $f : X \to [0, +\infty)$ be a lower semicontinuous function from $X$ into the non-negative real numbers. Suppose that, for all points $x$ in $X,$
$$d(x, T(x)) \leq f(x) - f(T(x)).$$

Then $T$ has a fixed point in $X;$ that is, a point $x_0$ such that $T(x_0) = x_0.$ The proof of this result utilizes Zorn's lemma to guarantee the existence of a minimal element which turns out to be a desired fixed point.
