= Leroy Milton Kelly =

American mathematician

Leroy Milton Kelly (May 8, 1914 – February 21, 2002) was an American mathematician whose research primarily concerned combinatorial geometry. In 1986 he settled a conjecture of Jean-Pierre Serre by proving that n points in complex 3-space, not all lying on a plane, determine an ordinary line—that is, a line containing only two of the n points. He taught at Michigan State University.

Kelly received his Ph.D. at the University of Missouri in 1948, advised by Leonard Mascot Blumenthal.

== Selected publications ==
- Kelly, L. M. (1986), "A resolution of the Sylvester–Gallai problem of J. P. Serre", Discrete and Computational Geometry, 1 (2): 101–104, doi:10.1007/BF02187687.
- Kelly, L. M.; Moser, W. O. J. (1958), "On the number of ordinary lines determined by n points", Can. J. Math., 10: 210–219, doi:10.4153/CJM-1958-024-6, S2CID 123865536, archived from the original on August 7, 2011.
