= DHS Cyber Security Division =

Agency overview
- Formed: 2011
- Jurisdiction: United States
- Headquarters: DHS Nebraska Avenue Complex, Washington D.C.
- Agency executive: Dr. Douglas Maughan, Director
- Parent agency: DHS Science and Technology Directorate
- Website: DHS Cyber Security Division

The Cyber Security Division (CSD) is a division of the Science and Technology Directorate (S&T Directorate) of the United States Department of Homeland Security (DHS). Within the Homeland Security Advanced Research Projects Agency, CSD develops technologies to enhance the security and resilience of the United States' critical information infrastructure from acts of terrorism. S&T supports DHS component operational and critical infrastructure protections, including the finance, energy, and public utility sectors, as well as the first responder community.

== CSD Mission ==
Mission statement as defined by S&T Directorate:

The Cyber Security Division's mission is to enhance the security and resilience of the nation's critical infrastructure and the Internet by "developing and delivering new technologies, tool and techniques; conducting and supporting technology transition; and leading and coordinating research and development." The Science and Technology Directorate oversees the work done by the CSD, and clearly defines the CSD's work as a means towards developing the future of cyber security.

Mission statement as defined by DHS:

Enhancing security and resilience of critical infrastructure. By "developing and delivering new technologies, tools and techniques in order for the U.S. to defend, mitigate and secure current and future systems, networks, and infrastructure from cyber-attacks." While conducting and supporting "technology transitions, leading and coordinating research and development (R&D) among the R&D community" (department customers, government agencies, private sector, and international partners). The Department of Homeland Security later defines its own division as more of a way to help defend and protect systems.

Mission statement as defined by Congressional Research Service:

The Cyber Security Division's mission is within the spectrum of "prevention, protection, mitigation, response, and recovery." DHS seeks to assess cyber risks and promote security and resilience of information communication technology (ICT) systems. When an incident occurs, DHS has "capabilities and authorities to provide direct assistance to the victim (both federal and non-federal)." While the Congressional Research Services combines the two and states that the CSD will in the case of an incident have the means towards assisting both public and private sectors.

== DHS Cybersecurity Program ==
Under the Science and Technology Directorate the Department of Homeland Security created its own Cyber Security Division. The division seeks to assist both private and public sectors. The CSD has programs across some current hard problems in information security research. These research programs include and are not limited to "Combating Insider Threats," "Combating Malware and Botnets," and "Identity Management." The CSD's goal is to not only save money and time while meeting DHS critical missions, but to "support S&T with transitioning technologies to operational use." Research in these programs include studying "Social Behavior," "Software Assurance," "Trustworthy Infrastructure." Which are then broken down further into "Usable Cybersecurity," "Cyber Economics Incentives," "Incident Response communities," "Software Quality Assurance and Marketplace," "Securing Protocols," and many more! The CSD recognizes that a failure to respond, creates enormous penalties.

== DHS Cybersecurity Strategy ==
The CSD strategy is to be a lead in cybersecurity research and awareness. The CDS develops and oversees DHS standards that "ensure reliable, interoperable and effective technologies and processes. This includes coordination and representation on a number of standard-setting bodies and organizations." The need to enhance the "efficiency and effectiveness of the U.S. government’s work to protect and secure critical infrastructure." CSD maintains a sense of teamwork in security and risk management across various research programs and partners.

== Science & Technology: Cyber Security Division ==
S&T’s CDS work closely with "DHS components to reduce or mitigate the challenges that DHS faces", and to "help these components execute their programs and systems in the safest, most-efficient, and most cost-effective way." The goal is to make improvements within cybersecurity, as it is a global issue international partners including "Australia, Canada, Japan, the Netherlands, Sweden, and the United Kingdom." All come together to work in "areas such as cyber enomic incentives, software assurance, and modeling of internet attacks."

== See also ==
- United States Department of Homeland Security
- Computer security
- National security
- DHS Science and Technology Directorate
- Homeland Open Security Technology
