= Leonard Blumenthal =

American mathematician (1901–1984)

Leonard Mascot Blumenthal (February 27, 1901 – August 1984) was an American mathematician.

== Career ==
Blumenthal was Jewish. He received his Ph.D. in 1927 from Johns Hopkins University, under the supervision of Frank Morley; his dissertation was titled Lagrange Resolvents in Euclidean Geometry. He taught for the majority of his professional career at the University of Missouri and was the author of A Modern View of Geometry.

He was a visiting scholar at the Institute for Advanced Study from 1933 to 1936. According to the Mathematics Genealogy Project, he had 18 Ph.D. students at Missouri, among them Leroy Milton Kelly and William Arthur Kirk; he is the academic ancestor of over 80 mathematicians.

== Legacy ==
The Leonard M. Blumenthal Distinguished Professorship in Mathematics at the University of Missouri was established in 1992 in honor of Blumenthal. This endowed chair is given on a five-year rotating basis to Missouri mathematics professors; the Blumenthal Professors at Missouri have included John Beem, Mark Ashbaugh, Alex Koldobsky, and Zhenbo Qin. The American Mathematical Society also issued the Blumenthal Award in his honor.

== Works ==
- Blumenthal L.M. Theory and applications of distance geometry (1953), Oxford: At the Clarendon Press (Geoffrey Cumberlege), XI, 347 p.
- Blumenthal L.M. Theory and applications of distance geometry, (2nd edition, 1970), Bronx, New York: Chelsea Publishing Company. XI, 347 p., ISBN 0-8284-0242-6
- Blumenthal L.M. A Modern View of Geometry (1961), W. H. Freeman & Co.; Dover edition (1980) ISBN 0-486-63962-2
