= Ulf Prange =

German politician and lawyer (born 1975)

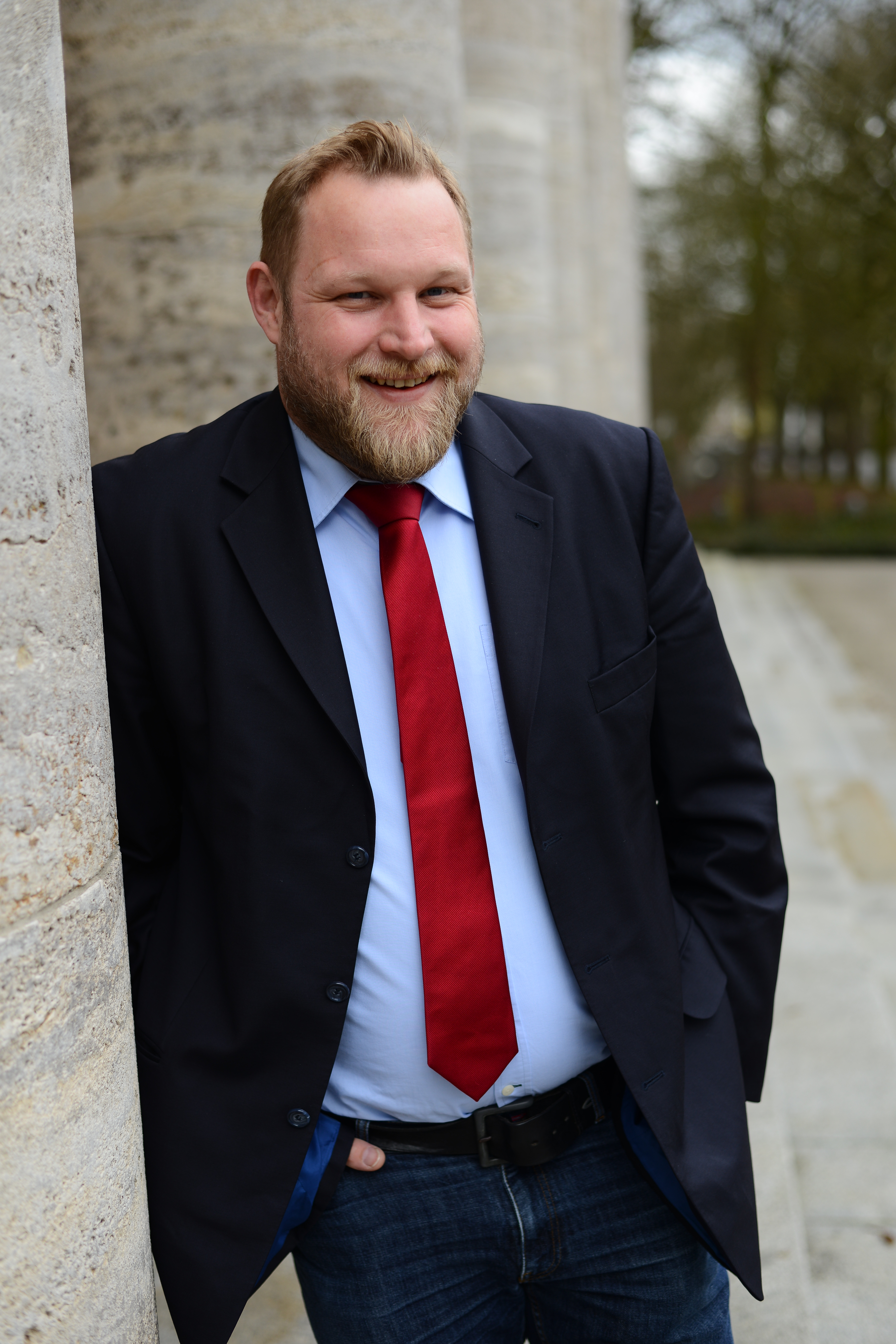
- Ulf Prange

Ulf Prange (born 25 July 1975 in Oldenburg) is a German lawyer and politician in the SPD and a member of Parliament in the state of Lower Saxony.
