= Jessie MacWilliams =

Mathematician, programmer

Florence Jessie MacWilliams
- Born: January 4, 1917; Stoke-on-Trent, England
- Died: May 27, 1990 (aged 73)
- Education: University of Cambridge, BA, 1938, MA, 1939, Johns Hopkins University, Harvard University, PhD under Andrew Gleason
- Occupations: Mathematician, programmer
- Employer: Bell Labs
- Known for: The MacWilliams identities in coding theory
- Notable work: The Theory of Error-Correcting Codes, with Neil Sloane
- Children: Daughter Anne, two sons

Florence Jessie Collinson MacWilliams (4 January 1917 – 27 May 1990) was an English mathematician who contributed to the field of coding theory, and was one of the first women to publish in the field. MacWilliams' thesis "Combinatorial Problems of Elementary Group Theory" (or "Combinatorial Problems of Elementary Abelian Groups") contains one of the most important combinatorial results in coding theory, which is now known as the MacWilliams Identity.

== Education and career ==
MacWilliams was born in Stoke-on-Trent, England and studied at the University of Cambridge, receiving her BA in 1938 and her MA in the following year. She moved to the United States in 1939 and studied at Johns Hopkins University. One year later she left Johns Hopkins for Harvard University.

In 1955 she became a programmer and learned coding theory at Bell Labs where she spent most of her career. Although she did major research at Bell Labs, she was denied a promotion to a mathematics research position until she received a Ph.D. She would proceed to fulfill some of the PhD's requirements while working at Bell Labs and taking care of her family, but she completed her PhD after returning to Harvard for one more year (1961–1962), under the supervision of Andrew Gleason. MacWilliams worked with Gleason to produce her thesis entitled "Combinatorial Problems of Elementary Group Theory". Both MacWilliams and her daughter Anne, who later obtained a PhD in Mathematics, were studying mathematics at Harvard that year.

== Contributions ==
Her formula is known as the MacWilliams identity, and is how MacWilliams is known. MacWilliams' result was later critical in proving an important bound on code rate, called the 'linear programming bound'.

From 1962 to 1976, Macwilliams produced important results on algebraic constructions and combinatorial properties of codes. She worked on cyclic codes, generalizing them to Abelian group codes. With H.B. Mann, MacWilliams gave a solution to a difficult problem involving certain design matrices, which they published in their paper titled "On the p-rank of the design matrix of a difference set".

One of MacWilliams' significant achievements was her encyclopedic book, The Theory of Error-Correcting Codes, which she wrote in collaboration with Neil Sloane and was published in 1977. The book is stated as being "Perhaps the most comprehensive text on the algebraic and combinatorial properties of error-correcting codes, and of abiding interest to both mathematicians and engineers. It was one of the major works responsible for laying the foundation for a revolution in communication technology that is being played out even today".

== Recognition ==
In 1980 she was the first Noether Lecturer.
