= Eugene Prange =

Eugene August Prange (July 30, 1917 – February 12, 2006) was an American coding theorist, a researcher at the Air Force Cambridge Research Laboratory (AFCRL) in Massachusetts who "introduced many of the early fundamental ideas of algebraic coding theory" and was the first to investigate cyclic codes in 1957. With Andrew Gleason, he is the namesake of the Gleason–Prange theorem on the symmetries of the extended quadratic residue code.

Prange was born in Illinois to August Prange and Eugenia Livingston. He graduated from the University of Illinois and spent World War II serving his country in England as an intelligence officer. He then studied at Harvard University before joining AFCRL.
