= Enumerator polynomial =

Specifies the number of words of a binary linear code of each possible Hamming weight

In coding theory, the weight enumerator polynomial of a binary linear code specifies the number of words of each possible Hamming weight.

Let $C \subset \mathbb{F}_2^n$ be a binary linear code of length $n$. The weight distribution is the sequence of numbers

$$A_t = \#\{c \in C \mid w(c) = t \}$$

giving the number of codewords c in C having weight t as t ranges from 0 to n. The weight enumerator is the bivariate polynomial

$$W(C;x,y) = \sum_{w=0}^n A_w x^w y^{n-w}.$$

== Basic properties ==
1. $W(C;0,1) = A_{0}=1$
2. $W(C;1,1) = \sum_{w=0}^{n}A_{w}=|C|$
3. $W(C;1,0) = A_{n}= 1 \mbox{ if } (1,\ldots,1)\in C\ \mbox{ and } 0 \mbox{ otherwise}$
4. $W(C;1,-1) = \sum_{w=0}^{n}A_{w}(-1)^{n-w} = A_{n}+(-1)^{1}A_{n-1}+\ldots+(-1)^{n-1}A_{1}+(-1)^{n}A_{0}$

== MacWilliams identity ==
Denote the dual code of $C \subset \mathbb{F}_2^n$ by

$$C^\perp = \{x \in \mathbb{F}_2^n \,\mid\, \langle x,c\rangle = 0 \mbox{  }\forall c \in C \}$$

(where $\langle\ ,\ \rangle$ denotes the vector dot product and which is taken over $\mathbb{F}_2$).

The MacWilliams identity states that

$$W(C^\perp;x,y) = \frac{1}{\mid C \mid} W(C;y-x,y+x).$$

The identity is named after Jessie MacWilliams.

== Distance enumerator ==
The distance distribution or inner distribution of a code C of size M and length n is the sequence of numbers

$$A_i = \frac{1}{M} \# \left\lbrace (c_1,c_2) \in C \times C \mid d(c_1,c_2) = i \right\rbrace$$

where i ranges from 0 to n. The distance enumerator polynomial is

$$A(C;x,y) = \sum_{i=0}^n A_i x^i y^{n-i}$$

and when C is linear this is equal to the weight enumerator.

The outer distribution of C is the 2^{n}-by-n+1 matrix B with rows indexed by elements of GF(2)^{n} and columns indexed by integers 0...n, and entries

$$B_{x,i} = \# \left\lbrace c \in C \mid d(c,x) = i \right\rbrace .$$

The sum of the rows of B is M times the inner distribution vector (A_{0},...,A_{n}).

A code C is regular if the rows of B corresponding to the codewords of C are all equal.
