= Henry Allan Gleason (linguist) =

American linguist

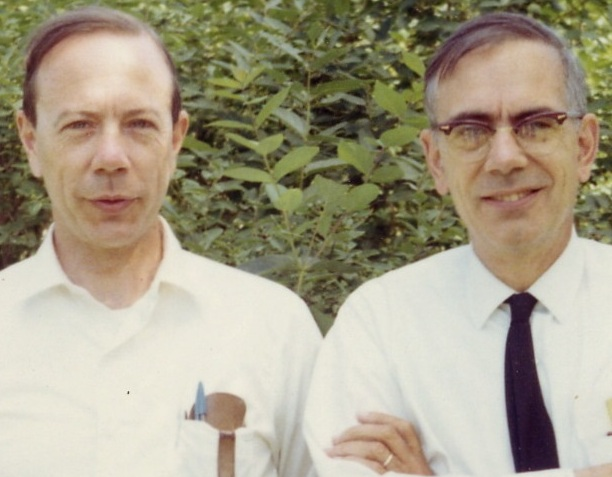
- With his brother, mathematician Andrew Mattei Gleason (left), in Toronto, 1969
- Born: April 18, 1917
- Died: January 13, 2007 (aged 89)
- Education: Hartford Seminary
- Scientific career
- Fields: Linguistics
- Workplaces: University of Toronto

Henry Allan 'Al' Gleason Jr. (April 18, 1917 – January 13, 2007) was an American linguist and Professor Emeritus at the University of Toronto.

== Career ==
Gleason began studying at Hartford Seminary in 1938 and received his PhD in 1946. His 1961 text "Introduction to Descriptive Linguistics" (with an accompanying workbook) was described in the journal Language as a suitable update to Leonard Bloomfield's well-known textbook Language. Gleason retired in 1982.

== Personal life ==
Gleason was a member of the American Bible Society, and a pastor in Fancy Gap, Virginia. His father was botanist Henry Gleason, and mathematician Andrew Gleason was his brother.
