= Henry A. Gleason =

American ecologist (1882-1975)

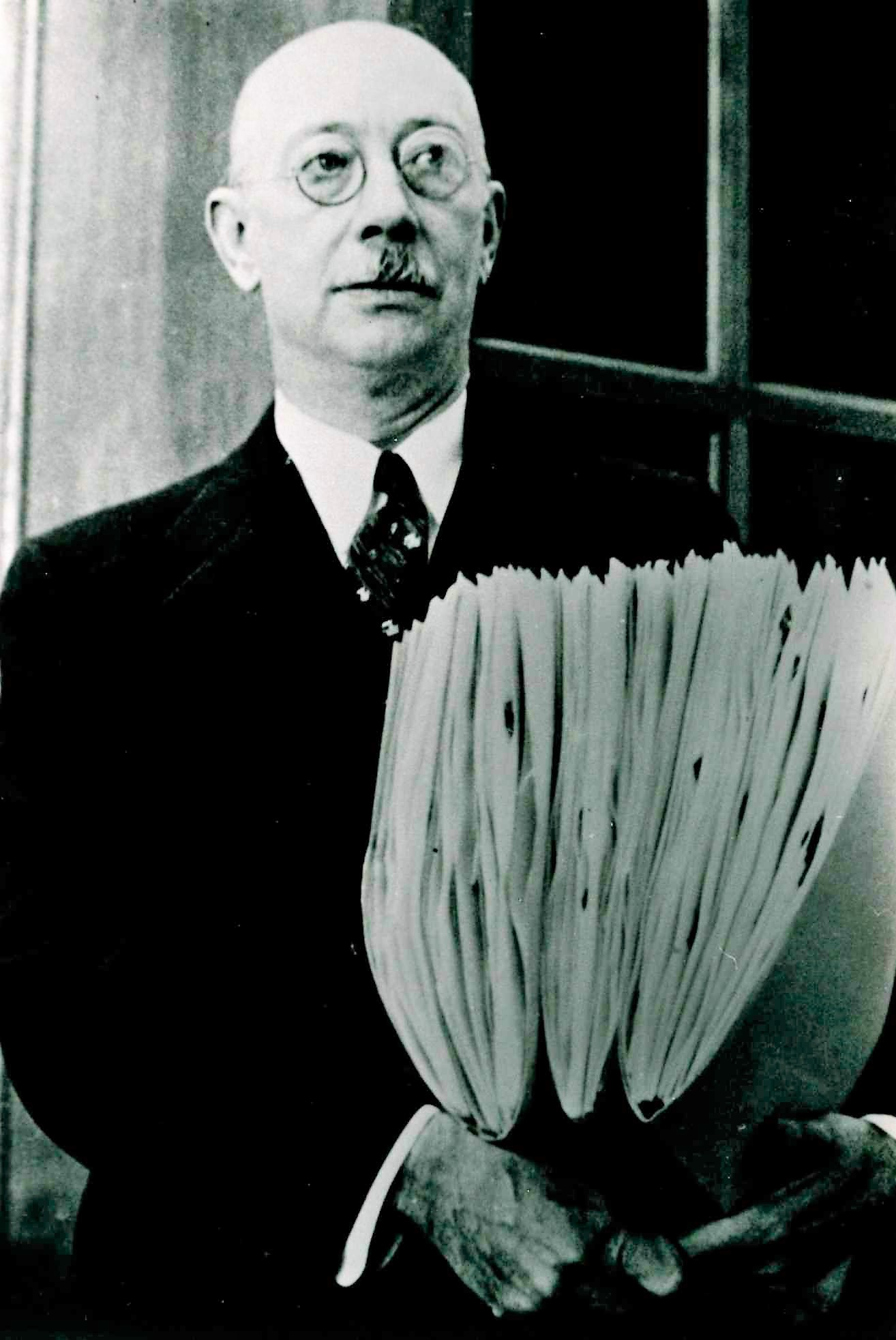
- Henry Allan Gleason
- Born: January 2, 1882
- Died: April 12, 1975 (aged 93)
- Education: University of Illinois; Columbia University
- Children: Henry Allan Gleason Jr; Anne Gleason Eudey; Andrew Gleason
- Scientific career
- Fields: Botany, Ecology
- Workplaces: University of Illinois; University of Chicago; University of Michigan; New York Botanical Garden
- Author abbrev. (botany): Gleason

Henry Allan Gleason (1882–1975) was an American ecologist, botanist, and taxonomist. He was known for his endorsement of the individualistic or open community concept of ecological succession, and his opposition to Frederic Clements's concept of the climax state of an ecosystem. His ideas were largely dismissed during his working life, leading him to move into plant taxonomy, but found favour late in the twentieth century.

The standard author abbreviation Gleason is used to indicate this person as the author when citing a botanical name.

== Life and work ==
Gleason was born in Dalton City, Illinois, and after undergraduate and master's work at the University of Illinois earned a PhD from Columbia University in Biology in 1906. He held faculty positions at the University of Illinois, the University of Chicago and the University of Michigan, before returning to the East Coast, to the New York Botanical Garden in the Bronx, New York, where he remained for the rest of his career, until 1950.

In Gleason's early ecological research on the vegetation of Illinois, around 1909–1912, he worked largely within the theoretical structure endorsed by ecologist Frederic Clements, whose work on succession was the most influential during the first decades of the twentieth century. Building on Henry C. Cowles's landmark research at the Indiana Dunes and some of the ideas of his mentor Charles Bessey at the University of Nebraska, Clements had developed a theory of plant succession in which vegetation could be explained by reference to an ideal sequence of development called a sere. Clements sometimes compared the development of seres to the growth of individual organisms, and suggested that under the right circumstances, seres would culminate in the best adapted form of vegetation, which he called the climax state. In his early research, Gleason interpreted the vegetation of Illinois using Clementsian concepts like associations, climax states, pioneer species, and dominant species.

However, in 1918, Gleason began to express significant doubts on the usefulness of some of Clements's widely employed vocabulary, especially the use of the organism metaphor to describe the growth of vegetation, and the treatment of the units of vegetation as including climaxes. (What units should be used in the analysis of vegetation was a widely disputed issue in early twentieth-century ecology.) In 1926, Gleason expressed even stronger objections to Clements's theory. First, he argued that Clements's identification of particular kinds of vegetation assumed too much homogeneity, since areas of vegetation are actually similar to one another only to degrees. Second, he argued that Clements's associating particular vegetation types with particular areas underestimated the real diversity of vegetation. These objections together cast doubt, for Gleason, on the "integrity of the association concept" itself—on identifying any grouping of species as amounting to a nameable association, like "oak-maple association," as botanists and ecologists (including Gleason himself) normally had.

As an alternative to describing vegetation in terms of associations, Gleason offered "the Individualistic concept of ecology," in which "the phenomena of vegetation depend completely upon the phenomena of the individual" species (1917), and plant associations are less structured than he thought Clements's theory maintained. At times, Gleason suggested that the distribution of plants approaches mathematical randomness.

Clements never responded in print to Gleason's objections and alternative models, and they were largely ignored until the 1950s, when research by a number of ecologists (particularly Robert Whittaker and John T. Curtis) supported Gleasonian models. Subsequently, 'species-individualistic' models have become prevalent in community ecology.

Frustration due to dismissal of his ecological ideas without serious consideration may have contributed to Gleason's general abandonment of ecology. From the 1930s onward, he shifted the focus of his work to plant taxonomy, where he became an influential figure, working for many years at the New York Botanical Garden, and authoring with Arthur Cronquist one of the authoritative floras of northeastern North America.

Gleason married Eleanor Theodolinda Mattei, the daughter of the Swiss-American winemaker Andrew Mattei; they met on a steamship, where Gleason was on a botanical expedition, while Mattei was taking a grand tour of the world following her graduation from Mills College. Their elder son, Henry Allan Gleason Jr (1917–2007), was a linguist and Professor Emeritus at the University of Toronto. Their second son, Andrew Gleason, (1921–2008), was a mathematician and Professor Emeritus at Harvard University.

== Awards and honors ==
- Named Honorary Fellow of the Association for Tropical Biology and Conservation in 1963.
- The 110 acre Henry Allan Gleason Nature Preserve Area in the Sand Ridge State Forest was dedicated after him in October 1970.

== Bibliography ==
=== Works by Gleason ===
- Gleason, Henry A. 1901. The flora of the prairies. B. S. Thesis. University of Illinois.
- Gleason, Henry A. 1907. A botanical survey of the Illinois River Valley sand region. Ill. State Lab. Nat. Hist., Bull. 7:149-194.
- Gleason, Henry A. 1907. On the biology of the sand areas of Illinois. II. A botanical survey of the Illinois River Valley sand region. Ill. Lab. Nat. Hist., Bull. 7:149-194.
- Gleason, Henry A. 1908. A virgin prairie in Illinois. Ill. Acad. Sci., Trans. 1:62.
- Gleason, Henry A. 1909. The vegetational history of a river dune. Ill. Acad. Sci., Trans. 2:19-26.
- Gleason, Henry A. 1909. Some Unsolved Problems of the Prairies. Bulletin of the Torrey Botanical Club 36(5): 265–271.
- Gleason, Henry A. 1910. The vegetation of the inland sand deposits of Illinois. Ill. Lab. Nat. Hist., Bull. 9:23-174.
- Gleason, Henry A. 1912. An Isolated Prairie Grove and Its Phytogeographical Significance. Botanical Gazette 53(1): 38–49.
- Gleason, Henry A. and Frank C. Gates. 1912. A Comparison of the Rates of Evaporation in Certain Associations in Central Illinois. Botanical Gazette 53(6): 478–491.
- Henry Gleason (October 1917). "The Structure and Development of the Plant Association". Bulletin of the Torrey Botanical Club. 44 (10): 463–481. doi:10.2307/2479596. ISSN 0040-9618. JSTOR 2479596. S2CID 89889039. Wikidata Q112770028.
- Gleason, Henry A. 1922. On the Relation between Species and Area. Ecology 3(2): 158–162.
- Gleason, Henry A. 1922. The Vegetational History of the Middle West. Annals of the Association of American Geographers 12: 39–85.
- Gleason, Henry A. 1925. Species and Area. Ecology 6(1): 66–74.
- Gleason, Henry A. (1926), "The Individualistic Concept of the Plant Association", Bulletin of the Torrey Botanical Club, 53 (1): 7–26, doi:10.2307/2479933, JSTOR 2479933
- Gleason, Henry A. 1927. Further Views on the Succession-Concept. Ecology 8(3): 299–326.
- Gleason, Henry A. 1936. Is Sunusia an Association? Ecology 17(3): 444–451.
- Gleason, Henry A. 1939. The Individualistic Concept of the Plant Association. American Midland Naturalist 21(1): 92–110.
- Gleason, Henry A. 1975. Delving into the History of American Ecology. Bulletin of the Ecological Society of America 56(4): 7–10.

=== Works on Gleason ===
- Barbour, Michael G. 1996. "Ecological Fragmentation in the Fifties". in William Cronon, editor. Uncommon Ground: Rethinking the Human Place in Nature. New York: W.W. Norton & Co., ISBN 9780393315110.
- McIntosh, Robert P. 1975. H. A. Gleason - "'Individualistic Ecologist' 1882-1975: His Contributions to Ecological Theory". Bulletin of the Torrey Botanical Club 102(5): 253–273.
- Mitman, Gregg. 1995. "Defining the Organism in the Welfare State: The Politics of Individuality in American Culture, 1890-1950". in Sabine Maasen, Everett Mendelsohn and Peter Weingart, editors. Biology as Society, Society as Biology: Metaphors. Dordrecht: Kluwer Academic.
- Nicolson, Malcolm and Robert P. McIntosh. 2002. "H.A. Gleason and the Individualistic Hypothesis Revisited". Bulletin of the Ecological Society of America 83: 133–142.
- Worster, Donald. 1994. Nature's Economy: A History of Ecological Ideas, 2nd ed. Cambridge and New York: Cambridge University Press.
- Marshall, Alan, The Unity of Nature: Wholeness and Disintegration in Science and Ecology, Imperial College Press: London, 2002.
- Kingsland, Sharon E. The evolution of American ecology, 1890-2000. Johns Hopkins University Press, 2005.
