= Daniel Oerther =

American academic (born 1972)

- Oerther at the 2025 National Academies of Practice Annual Meeting and Forum
- Born: Daniel Barton Oerther; October 11, 1972; Columbus, Ohio, US
- Other name: Dan Oerther
- Education: Northwestern University, University of Illinois Urbana-Champaign
- Known for: Environmental Engineering 3.0, COAST parametric insurance, GRoWES project, Modified mastery learning, Nurse+Engineer, Planetary health
- Awards: Pohland Medal, AEESP (2017), Leal Award, AWWA (2018), Quinn Award, ASEE (2019), Wald Award, NLN (2019), Fair Medal, WEF (2020), Copeland Award, Sigma Nursing (2023), Fraser Award, IFEES (2024)
- Scientific career
- Fields: Environmental Health Engineering, Planetary Health, Science Diplomacy, InterProfessional Education, Environmental Biotechnology
- Workplaces: University of Cincinnati, Missouri University of Science and Technology, United States Department of State, American Academy of Environmental Engineers and Scientists, Duquesne University
- Thesis: Using molecular signature methods to measure the in situ physiology of Acinetobacter spp. in enhanced biological phosphorus removal activated sludge (2002)
- Doctoral advisor: Lutgarde Raskin
- Doctoral students: Pascal Saikaly, Regina Lamendella
- Website: www.oerther.org/DanielOerther/

Daniel Barton Oerther (born October 11, 1972) is an American professor. He is best known for articulating Environmental Engineering 3.0. Through his leadership bridging engineering and nursing, Oerther has advanced environmental health practice through science diplomacy to solve the problems of planetary health. His early discovery research used 16S ribosomal RNA-targeted techniques for fundamental studies of the ecology of bacteria in engineered and natural systems. His applied practice promotes transdisciplinarity among engineers, nurses, and sanitarians to improve access to clean water, nutritious food, efficient energy use, and financial services in developing communities. In the classroom, laboratory, and through problem-based learning, Oerther practices innovation in the scholarship of teaching and learning, including modified mastery learning.

== Life and education ==
Born in Columbus, Ohio, Oerther grew up in Louisville, Kentucky, and graduated from Saint Xavier High School. He earned a Baccalaureate of Arts (BA) in Biological Sciences (1995) and a Baccalaureate of Sciences (BS) in Environmental Engineering (1995) from Northwestern University. He earned a Masters of Science (MS) in Environmental Engineering (1998) and a Doctorate of Philosophy (PhD) (2002) from the University of Illinois. He completed post-doctoral training in microbial ecology at the Marine Biological Laboratory, environmental health at the University of Cincinnati, public health at Johns Hopkins University, and public administration at Indiana University Bloomington.

== Employment ==
=== University of Cincinnati ===
Oerther served as head of the Department of Civil and Environmental Engineering at the University of Cincinnati He created a campus-wide minor in sustainability and founded a student chapter of Engineers Without Borders. Nancy L. Zimpher recognized Oerther with the president's Excellence Award in 2007.

=== Missouri University of Science and Technology ===
In 2010, Oerther joined the faculty of the Missouri University of Science and Technology as the John A. and Susan Mathes Endowed Chair of Environmental Engineering (2010-2016). He promoted the Solar Village, and established the Diplomacy Lab program on campus. Mun Choi recognized Oerther with the president's Award for Cross-Cultural Engagement in 2017 and the University of Missouri System's C. Brice Ratchford Fellowship in 2019 for advancing the institution's land grant mission

=== United States Department of State ===
From 2014 to 2021, Oerther was a Foreign Affairs Officer at the United States Department of State in the Secretary's Office of Global Food Security. He represented the United States at the Second International Conference on Nutrition, the launch of the Blue Growth Network in St. George's, Grenada, the second Our Ocean Conference in Valparaíso, Chile, and the 43rd plenary session of the Committee on World Food Security in Rome, Italy. Ambassador Nancy Stetson recognized Oerther with a Meritorious Honor Award for his efforts to create COAST. Oerther's additional recognitions from the State Department include the 2005 Fulbright-Nehru Scholar to the Indian Institute of Science, India, the 2012 Fulbright-ALCOA Distinguished Chair to the Federal University of Western Para, Brazil, the Jefferson Science Fellowship (2014-2019), and the 2019 Fulbright Scholar to King's College London, UK.

=== American Academy of Environmental Engineers and Scientists ===
In 2013, Oerther was elected treasurer of the American Academy of Environmental Engineers and Scientists. He served as president in 2022, and as Executive Director from 2023-2026. His awards from the academy include the 2016 Superior Achievement Award for, "Improved water quality in Ixcan, Guatemala." Throughout 2020, Oerther served as the academy's Kappe Distinguished Lecturer.

== Appointments ==
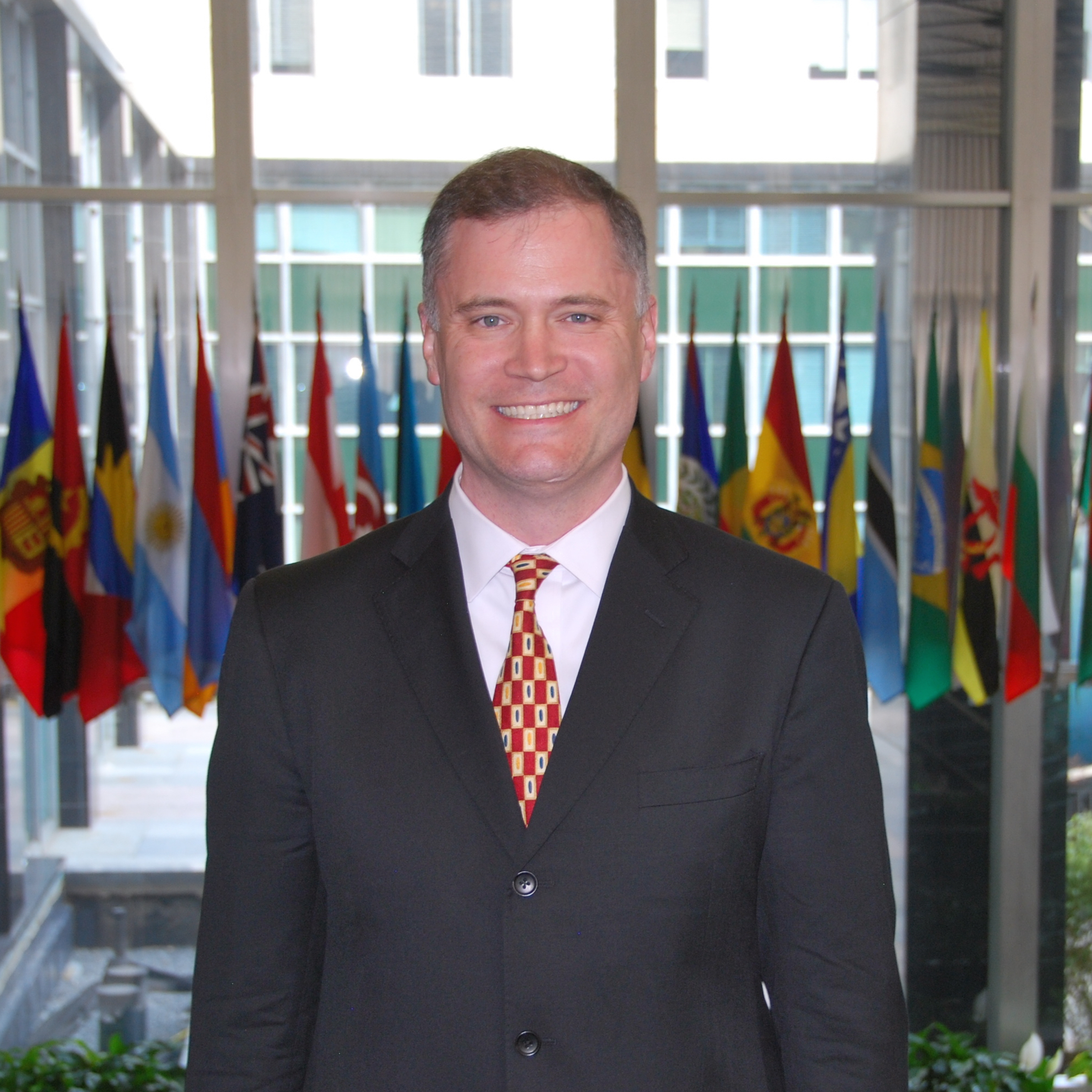
Daniel Oerther at the United States Department of State in 2015

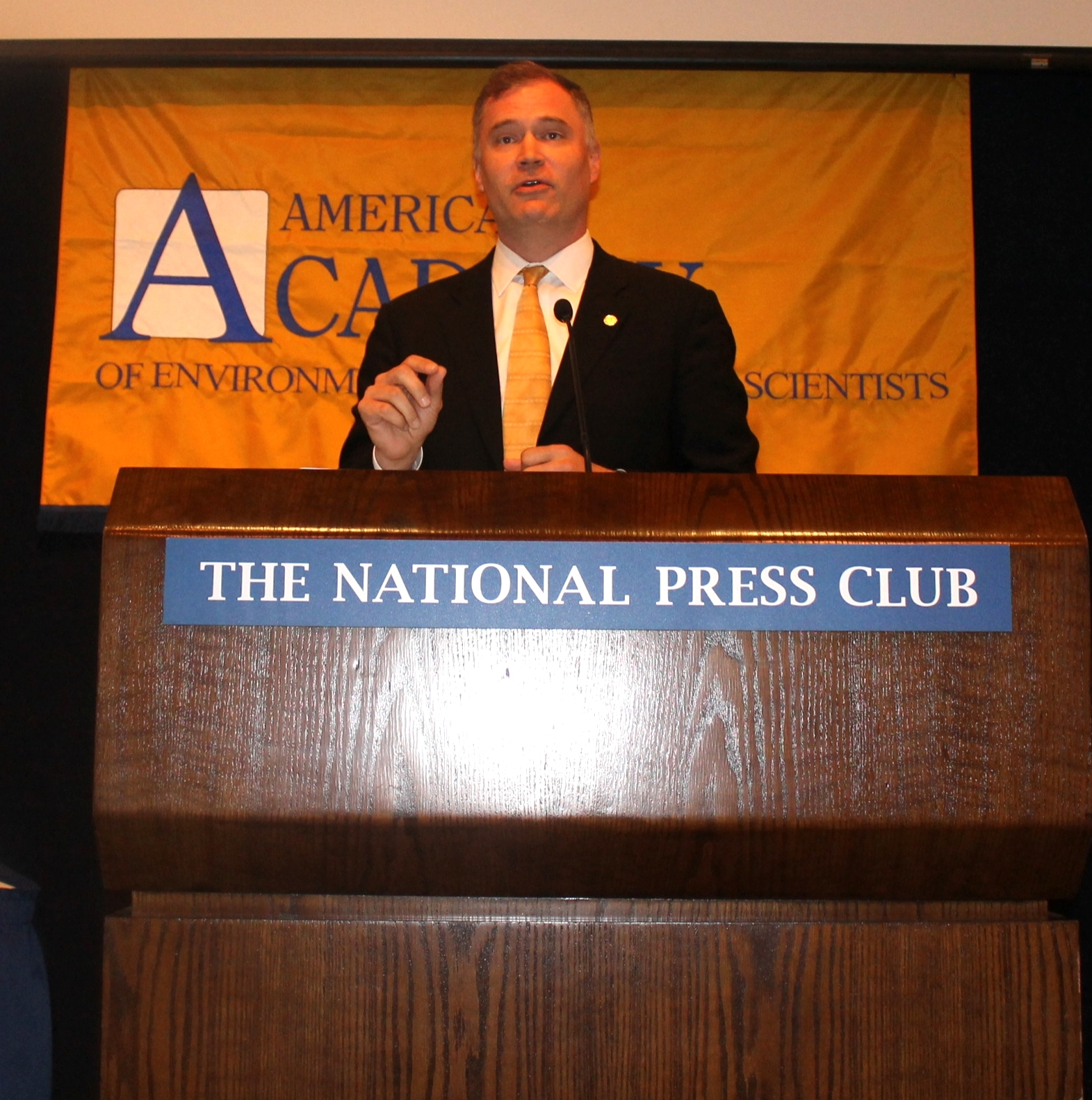
Daniel Oerther addressing the 2016 AAEES Spring Meeting

=== Council of Engineering and Scientific Specialty Boards ===
In 2023, Oerther was elected vice president of the Council of Engineering and Scientific Specialty Boards. In 2024, he was elected president, and in 2025 he was re-elected president for an additional year.

=== Missouri Hazardous Waste Management Commission ===
In 2020, Oerther was appointed to the Missouri Hazardous Waste Management Commission by Governor Mike Parson (R). He served as chair of the commission from 2022 through 2024.

=== Journal of Environmental Engineering ===
Oerther is an associate editor of the Journal of Environmental Engineering, published by the American Society of Civil Engineers.

=== Fellowships ===
In the United States, Oerther has been recognized as an Honorary Fellow of the American Academy of Nursing (2016) and an Honorary Fellow of the Academy of Nursing Education of the National League for Nursing (2018), making him among a small number of licensed Professional Engineers to hold dual honorary fellowship in both nursing-leadership academies. He is also a Fellow of the Association of Environmental Engineering and Science Professors (2020), and the National Academies of Practice (2025).

In the United Kingdom, Oerther has been recognized as a Fellow of the Royal Society of Arts (2017), the Royal Society for Public Health (2017), the Society of Environmental Engineers (2018), the Chartered Institute of Environmental Health (2018), and the Society of Operations Engineers (2020).

=== Additional appointments ===
Oerther was an associate editor of the journal, Water Environment Research, published by the Water Environment Federation, and a member of the international advisory board of the journal, Perspectives in Public Health, published by the Royal Society for Public Health.

Oerther was a visiting professor at the Institute of Science and Technology for Advanced Studies and Research, Gujarat, India, an adjunct professor in the School of Life Sciences, Manipal University in Karnataka, India, a Faculty Consultant at Future University in Egypt, an adjunct professor at Federal University of Western Para, Brazil, a visiting scholar at King's College London, and a professor of nursing (by courtesy) at Duquesne University.

Oerther was a member of the board of directors and the chief information officer of the Association of Environmental Engineering and Science Professors (2007-2010).

From 2013 to 2021, Oerther was a member of the board of directors of the Sigma Theta Tau International Building Corporation. He served as treasurer from 2019 to 2021.

Oerther was a member of the board of trustees of the Chartered Institute of Environmental Health (2020-2023). He served as chair in 2023.

From 2020 to 2024, Oerther was a member of the board of directors of Engineers Without Borders – USA. He served as treasurer from 2022 through 2024.

== Selected work ==
Oerther co-led studies to address food deserts in urban Cincinnati, and rural Missouri. And he has worked to eliminate childhood stunting in Brazil, Guatemala, and South Africa through the Global Research on WaSH - water, sanitation, and hygiene - to Eliminate childhood Stunting (GRoWES) project.

Oerther helped to design, finance, construct, and equip community health clinics in Tanzania and Ghana. And he helped bring clean drinking water and community latrines to villages in Kenya, Tanzania, and India.

Oerther co-founded PulaCloud, LLC to bring entry-level jobs in human computation supporting the knowledge-economy to Kenya and to rural Missouri. And with his family, he demonstrated small-home living in Missouri.

Oerther helped to design and launch a parametric insurance product, which aims to formalize the artisanal fishing sector throughout the Caribbean as a way of improving governance and sustainable management of catch fisheries via COAST - the Caribbean Ocean and Aquaculture Sustainability faciliTy. Following Hurricane Beryl in July 2024, COAST made its first major operational payout, with the Caribbean Catastrophe Risk Insurance Facility Segregated Portfolio Company paying US$1.07 million to the Government of Grenada under the COAST fisheries policy as part of a total US$44 million payout to Grenada across all CCRIF parametric policies triggered by the storm.

== Scholarly activities ==
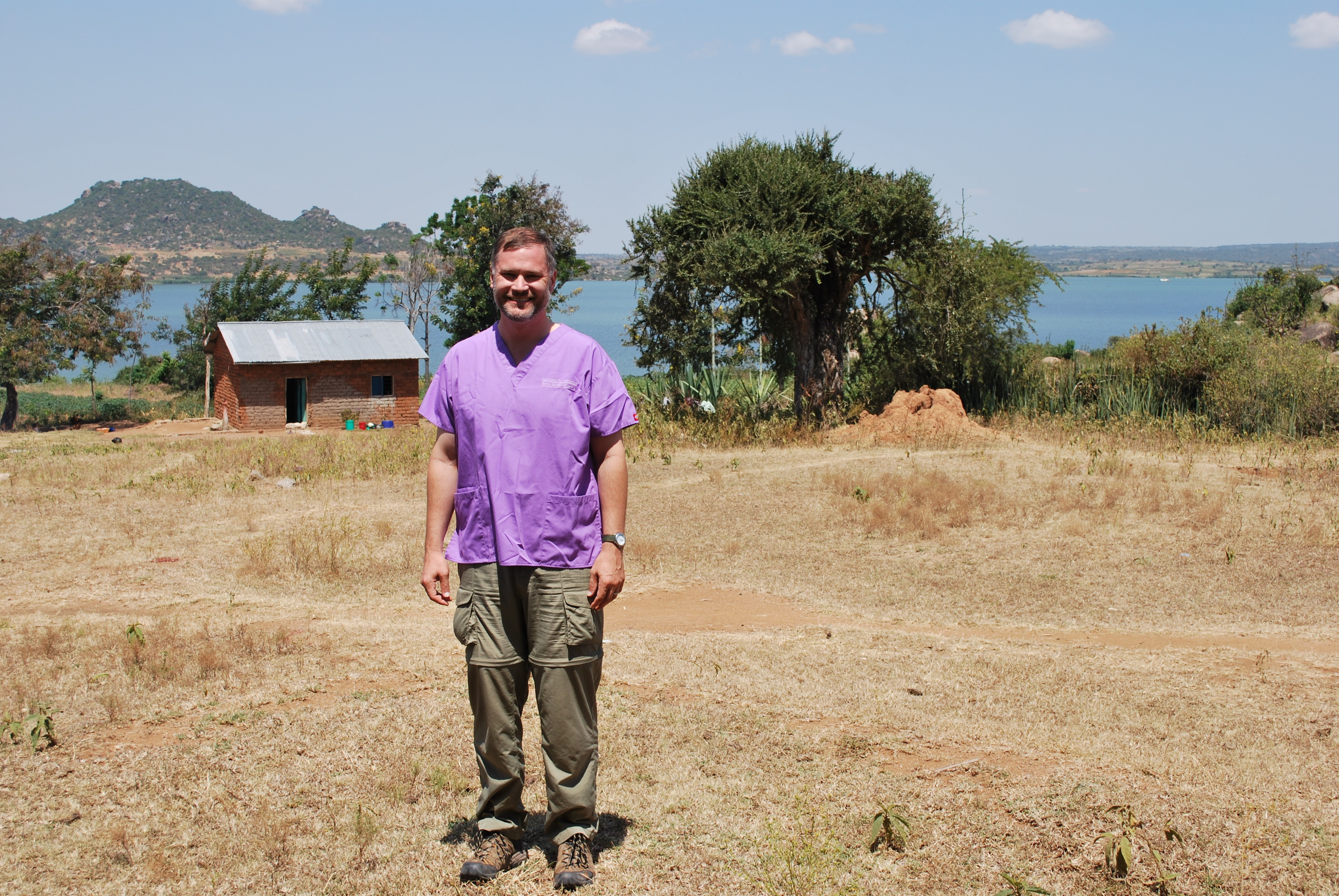
Daniel Oerther poses in the village of Burere while conducting household health assessments in Tanzania

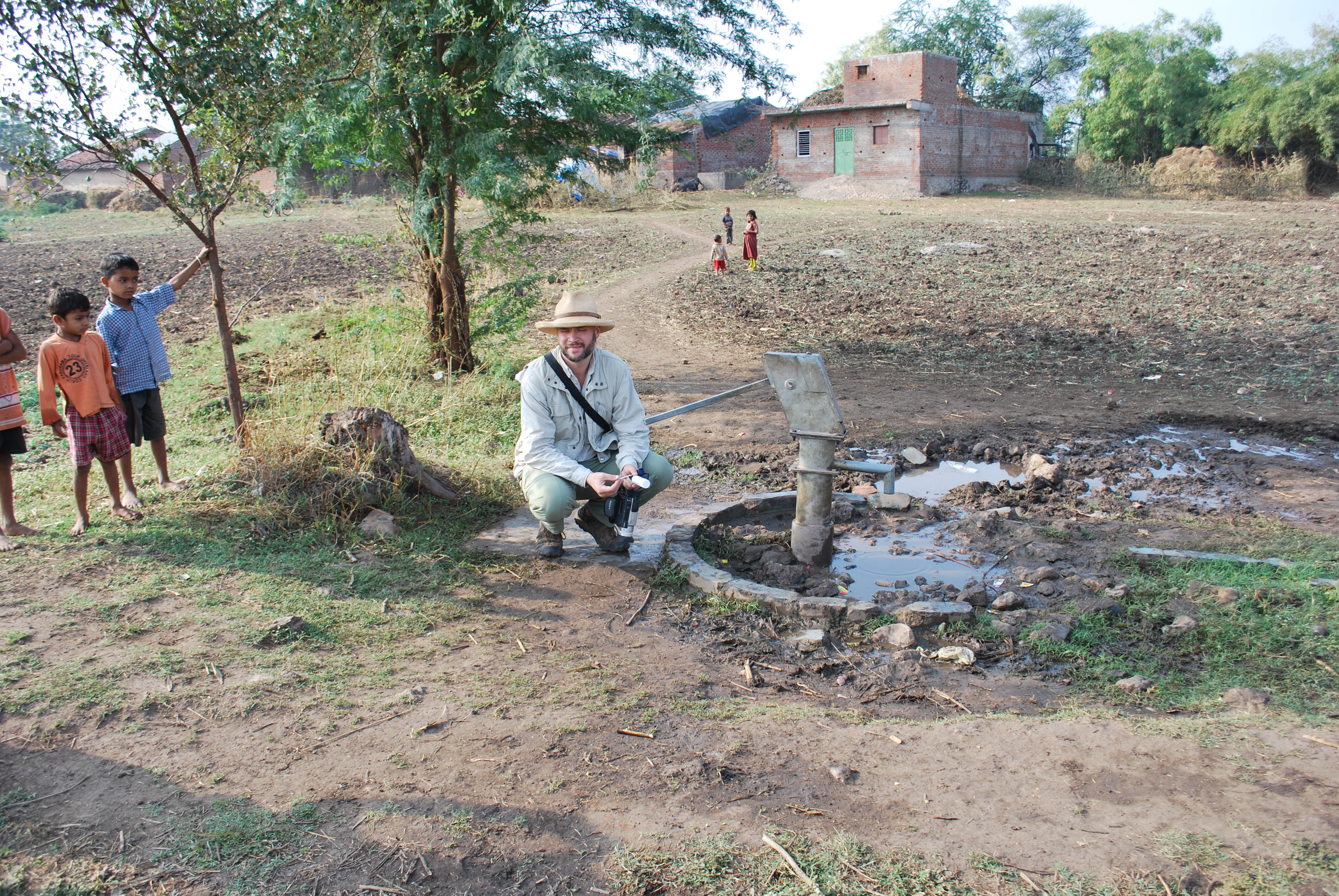
Daniel Oerther testing samples of drinking water in rural Gujarat, India

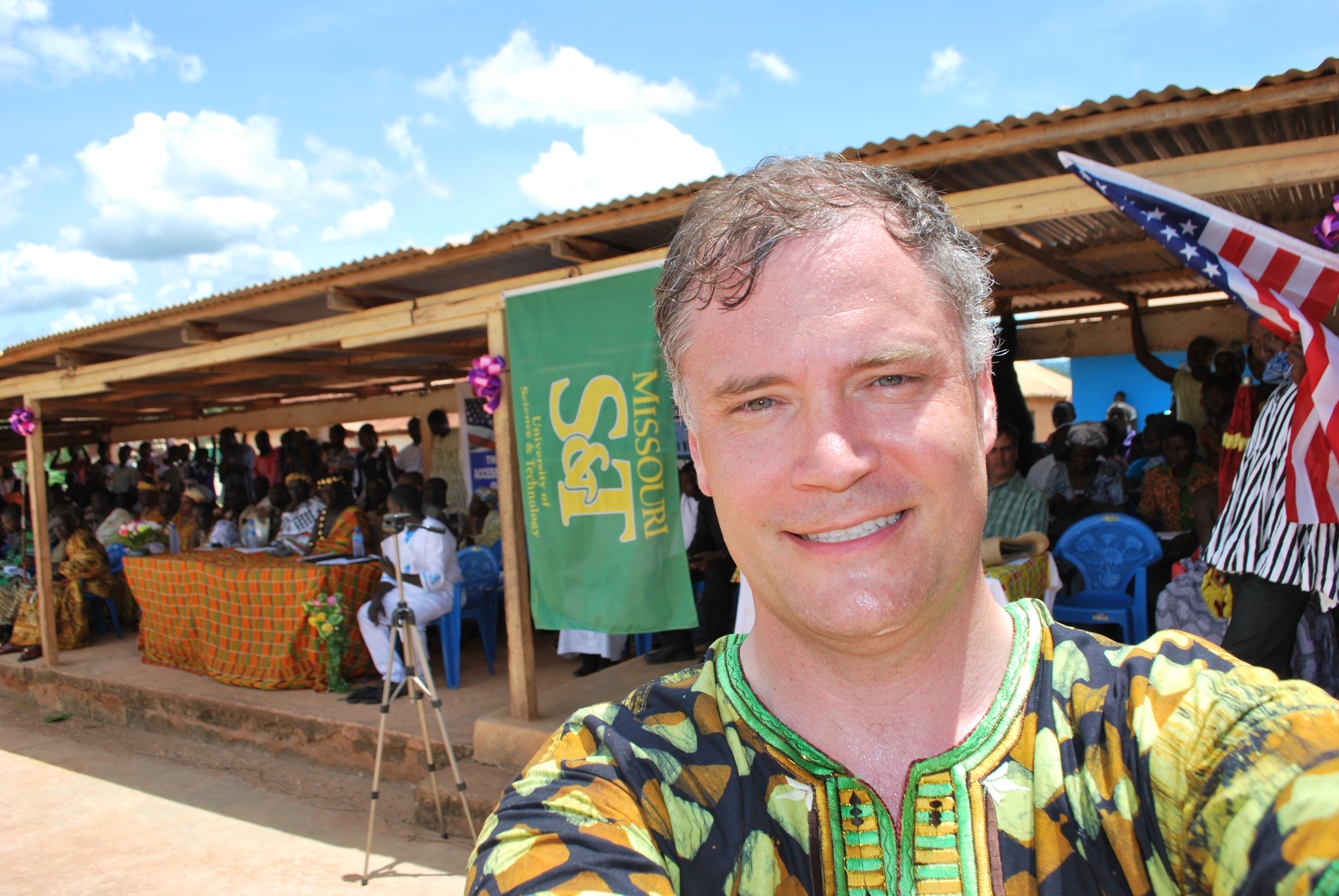
Daniel Oerther enjoying the celebration commemorating the donation of an ambulance in Asakrabreman, Ghana

=== Environmental biotechnology ===
Oerther is part of a team of faculty working in the field of environmental biotechnology – where 16S ribosomal RNA-targeted techniques and microbial genomics are used to advance the understanding of ecology in engineered and natural systems used by environmental engineers and scientists to treat water, soils, and gases. His contributions have included:

- development of methods to identify the origin of microbiological contamination from fecal wastes discharged to watersheds.
- recommendations to improve the performance of suspended growth, aerobic, municipal sewage treatment systems perturbed by discharges of industrial pollutants;
- recommendations to reduce the early stages of membrane biofouling in aerobic, submerged membrane bioreactors;

=== Interprofessional environmental health ===
Oerther works with teams of engineers, nurses, and other health care professionals to work alongside developing communities around the world as part of community-based participatory research (CBPR). His contributions have included:

- fundamental studies on the environmental determinants of childhood stunting including the interaction of microbial contamination of drinking water and aflatoxin contamination of maize.
- the adaptation of structural equation modeling to evaluate causes of diarrhea illness in rural Guatemala, rural Brazil, and South Africa;
- demonstration of the use of sovereign parametric insurance to support food and nutrition security for artisanal and small-scale fisherfolk;
- application of care economist Nancy Folbre's "care penalty" framework to environmental engineering, identifying the field's lowest-median-salary status among engineering subdisciplines despite high educational attainment and the highest proportion of women;

=== Scholarship of teaching and learning ===
- the creation and dissemination of a novel course teaching molecular biology skills to engineers through hands-on laboratory activities without prerequisite knowledge of biology;
- recommendations for adapting mastery learning from nursing for use in the field of environmental engineering;
- development of courses teaching: science diplomacy; environmental health; and environmental modeling;
- pioneering V-shaped professionalism in convergence research, in which two or more disciplines pursue a common deep scientific question or societal challenge, distinct from interdisciplinary approaches that maintain disciplinary boundaries; Oerther has applied the framework to two prototype roles: the Nurse+Engineer and Humanitarian Technologist.

== Awards ==
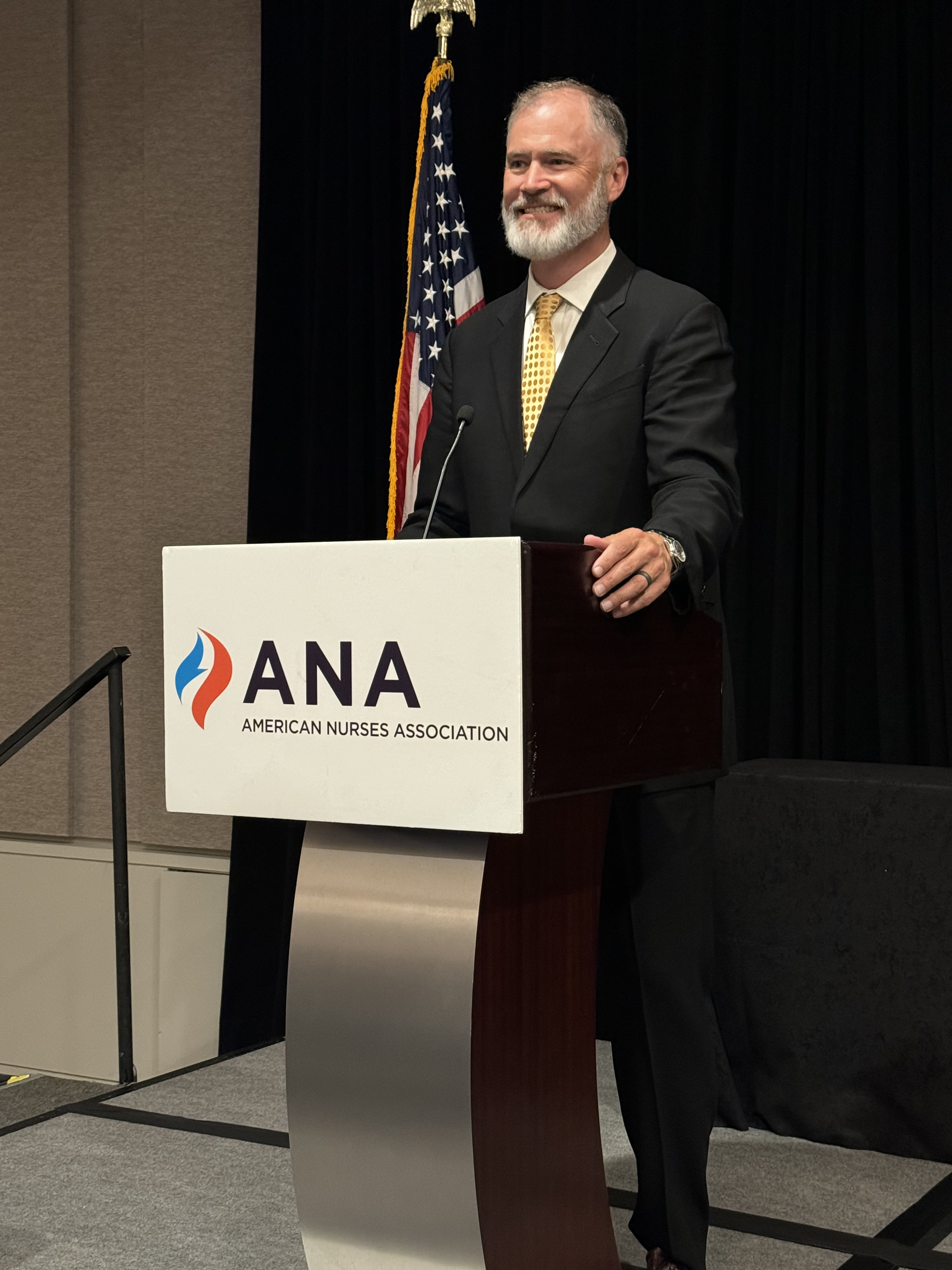
Daniel Oerther addressing the 2024 ANA Meeting

Oerther's awards include:

- 2003, CAREER Award, National Science Foundation
- 2004, Outstanding Contribution to Environmental Engineering and Science Education Award from the Association of Environmental Engineering and Science Professors
- 2005, invited participant, "National Academies Keck Futures Initiative: The Genomics Revolution: Implication for Treatment and Control of Infectious Disease"
- 2011, invited participant, "National Academies Frontiers of Engineering Education"
- 2015, Steven K. Dentel/AEESP Award for Global Outreach
- 2015, invited participant, "National Academies Keck Futures Initiative: Art, Design and Science, Engineering and Medicine Frontier Collaborations Ideation, Translation, Realization"
- 2018, Best Innovative Environmental Health Solution Award from the Chartered Institute of Environmental Health
- 2019, Engineering Education Excellence Award for demonstrated ability to link engineering education with professional practice, from the National Society of Professional Engineers
- 2023, Diplomate Laureate, from the American Academy of Sanitarians
- 2023, Joe Beck Educational Contribution Award, from the National Environmental Health Association
- 2024, Champion of Nursing Award, from the American Nurses Association
- 2025, invited participant, "National Academies Consensus Committee: Education for Thriving in a Changing Climate"
- 2025, Stanford-Elsevier Top 2% Scientist, career citations.

== Bibliography ==
Oerther has more than 160 publications listed on Scopus. These publications have been cited more than 3,000 times. Examples of his most-cited articles include:

- Alm, Elizabeth; Oerther, Daniel; Larsen, Neils; Stahl, David; Raskin, Lutgarde (1996). "The oligonucleotide probe database". Applied and Environmental Microbiology. 62 (10): 3557–3559. Bibcode:1996ApEnM..62.3557A. doi:10.1128/aem.62.10.3557-3559.1996. PMC 168159. PMID 8837410.
- Choi, H.; Zhang, Kai; Dionysiou, Dionysious; Oerther, Daniel; Sorial, George (2005). "Effect of permeate flux and tangential flow on membrane fouling for wastewater treatment". Separation and Purification Technology. 45 (1): 68–78. doi:10.1016/j.seppur.2005.02.010.
- Lamendella, Regina; Santo Domingo, Jorge; Ghosh, Shreya; Martinson, J.; Oerther, Daniel (2011). "Comparative fecal metagenomics unveils unique functional capacity of the swine gut". BMC Microbiology. 11 103. doi:10.1186/1471-2180-11-103. PMC 3123192. PMID 21575148.

From 2019 through 2023, Oerther was the most prolific author in the Scopus SciVal category of "Sustainable Development; Nurse; Public Health". Representative articles in this category include:

- Oerther, Daniel; Oerther, Sarah (2021). "From interprofessional to convergence: Nurses educating V-shaped professionals". Nurse Education in Practice. 53 103047. doi:10.1016/j.nepr.2021.103047. PMID 33865083.
- Oerther, Daniel; Glasgow, MaryEllen (2022). "The nurse+engineer as the prototype V-shaped professional". Nursing Outlook. 70 (2): 280–291. doi:10.1016/j.outlook.2021.10.007. PMID 34922765.
- Oerther, Daniel; Gautham, Leila; Folbre, Nancy (2022). "Environmental engineering as care for human welfare and planetary health". Journal of Environmental Engineering. 148 (6) 04022029. doi:10.1061/(ASCE)EE.1943-7870.0002013.
