= Parametric =

Parametric may refer to:

== Mathematics ==
- Parametric equation, a representation of a curve through equations, as functions of a variable
- Parametric statistics, a branch of statistics that assumes data has come from a type of probability distribution
- Parametric derivative, a type of derivative in calculus
- Parametric model, a family of distributions that can be described using a finite number of parameters
- Parametric oscillator, a harmonic oscillator whose parameters oscillate in time
- Parametric surface, a particular type of surface in the Euclidean space R^{3}
- Parametric family, a family of objects whose definitions depend on a set of parameters

== Science ==
- Parametric process, in optical physics, any process in which an interaction between light and matter does not change the state of the material
- Spontaneous parametric down-conversion, in quantum optics, a source of entangled photon pairs and of single photons
- Optical parametric amplifier, a type of laser light source that emits light of variable wavelengths
- Statistical parametric mapping, a statistical technique for examining differences in brain activity recorded during functional neuroimaging
- Parametric search

== Financial services ==
- Parametric contract, a financial or investment contract
- Parametric insurance, insurance that agrees to make a payment upon the occurrence of a triggering event
- Parametric feature based modeler, a modeler using features defined to be parametric shapes associated with attributes

== Computing ==
- Parametric polymorphism, a feature of some type systems in computer programming
- Parametric animation, a computer-animation technique
- Parametric Technology Corporation, an American technology company
- Software parametric models, a set of related mathematical equations that incorporates variable parameters

== Other uses ==
- Parametric feature based modeler, a modeler using features defined to be parametric shapes associated with attributes.
- Parametric determinism, a Marxist interpretation of the course of history.
- Parametric equalizer, a multi-band variable equalizer.
- Parametric array, a nonlinear transduction mechanism.
- Parametric design, a design process.
- Parametricism, an architectural style.

== See also ==
- Parameter (disambiguation)
