= African Risk Capacity =

African insurer

African Risk Capacity Limited
- Company type: Public
- Industry: Insurance
- Founded: 2014
- Headquarters: Abidjan, Ivory Coast
- Area served: Africa
- Key people: Lindelwe Lesley Ndlovu, CEO; Abdoulie Janneh, Chairperson
- Products: Parametric insurance solutions against climate and health risks
- Parent: African Risk Capacity "ARC" Group
- Website: www.arc.int/arc-limited

African Risk Capacity Limited or simply ARC Ltd, is an African insurer which provides parametric insurance services for climate change and health risks to the member states of the African Union. ARC Ltd was founded in 2014 as a financial affiliate of the African Risk Capacity (ARC), a specialized agency of the African Union. As of January 2024, ARC Ltd works as a mutual insurance facility comprising 39 African member countries, and its capital contributors including USAID, SDC, FCDO, KFW/BMZ, IFAD, AFDB, WFP and START NETWORK.

In September 2021, ARC Ltd joined the UN-convened Net-Zero Asset Owner Alliance (NZAOA), a UN initiative of institutional investors committed to transitioning their investment portfolios to net-zero GHG emissions by 2050, as the first African company to do so. On 27 April 2023, in Munich, Germany, ARC Ltd received the Closing the Gap award at the Trading Risk Awards 2023, a recognition of the company’s outbreaks and epidemics insurance products.

== History ==
ARC Ltd is a hybrid mutual insurer and financial affiliate of the African Risk Capacity Group. It was established in 2014 with a specific commercial mandate as a Bermuda Class 2 mutual insurance company with seed capital funding from UK’s Foreign, Commonwealth & Development Office (FCDO), and Germany’s KfW through BMZ. Eventually, ARC Ltd is wholly owned by African sovereigns. The mandate of ARC Ltd is to create customized parametric insurance solutions against climate and health risks. Since its inception, ARC Ltd has successfully underwritten ten annual risk pools and is currently Africa’s largest provider of parametric insurance.

== Vision and mission ==
ARC Ltd provides parametric insurance services to member states of the African Union and farmer organizations, employing innovative financing mechanisms to pool disaster-related risk across Africa and transferring it to international risk markets. By transferring the burden of natural disaster risks away from governments and their populations, ARC Ltd facilitates a deliberated response approach to disasters. It disburses financing to fund pre-approved contingency plans to respond rapidly and predictably to disasters.

== Leadership ==
Lindelwe Lesley Ndlovu is the chief executive officer at African Risk Capacity "ARC" Limited, and Dr. Abdoulie Janneh serves as the Chairperson of Board of Directors. Ibrahima Cheik Diong is the Director General of the ARC Group, and Dr. Mothae Anthony Maruping is the chairperson.

== See also ==
- Parametric insurance
- Caribbean Catastrophe Risk Insurance Facility Segregated Portfolio Company
