= Micro-retailing =

Micro-retailing, or microretailing, has two distinct meanings. The first describes how some businesses are moving from having giant superstores to smaller, demographically targeted stores that focus on a small selection of popular products. The second refers to small, independent, family owned businesses in developing nations.

== See also ==
- Retailing
- Microfinance
- Microcredit
- Microinsurance
