= Nancy Stetson =

American diplomat

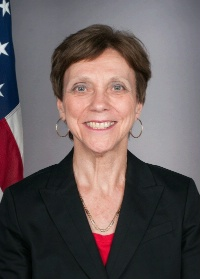

United States Special Representative for Global Food Security
- In office June 23, 2014 – January 20, 2017
- President: Barack Obama
- Preceded by: Jonathan Shrier (acting)
- Succeeded by: Vacant

Deputy Coordinator for Diplomacy for Feed the Future
- In office June 23, 2014 – January 20, 2017
- President: Barack Obama
- Preceded by: Jonathan Shrier (acting)

United States Ambassador to Habitat III
- In office October 17, 2016 – October 20, 2016
- President: Barack Obama

Personal details
- Education: Wellesley College; Columbia University

Nancy Stetson is the former United States Special Representative for Global Food Security, responsible for leading all aspects of U.S. diplomacy related to food security and nutrition, appointed by U.S. Secretary of State John Kerry on June 23, 2014. She is also the Deputy Coordinator for Diplomacy for Feed the Future - the US government's global hunger and food security initiative. In October 2016, Ambassador Stetson was the deputy head of delegation for the U.S. party to Habitat III - the United Nations Conference on Housing and Sustainable Urban Development.

== Biography ==
Stetson graduated with a baccalaureate degree in political science from Wellesley College, and she earned her Ph.D. from Columbia University in political science. For more than 25 years she served on the staff of the United States Senate Committee on Foreign Relations as well as in the role of Senior Foreign Policy Advisor to then-Senator John Kerry. In these roles, she contributed to the South Africa sanctions bill, normalization of relations between the United States and Vietnam, and funding for HIV/AIDS relief.

In her role as the United States Special Representative for Global Food Security, Stetson emphasized the importance of partnerships to address malnutrition, addressing food security through Feed the Future is a moral imperative, and addressing food security requires a recognition of a balance among disaster-response operations and longer-term humanitarian assistance operations.

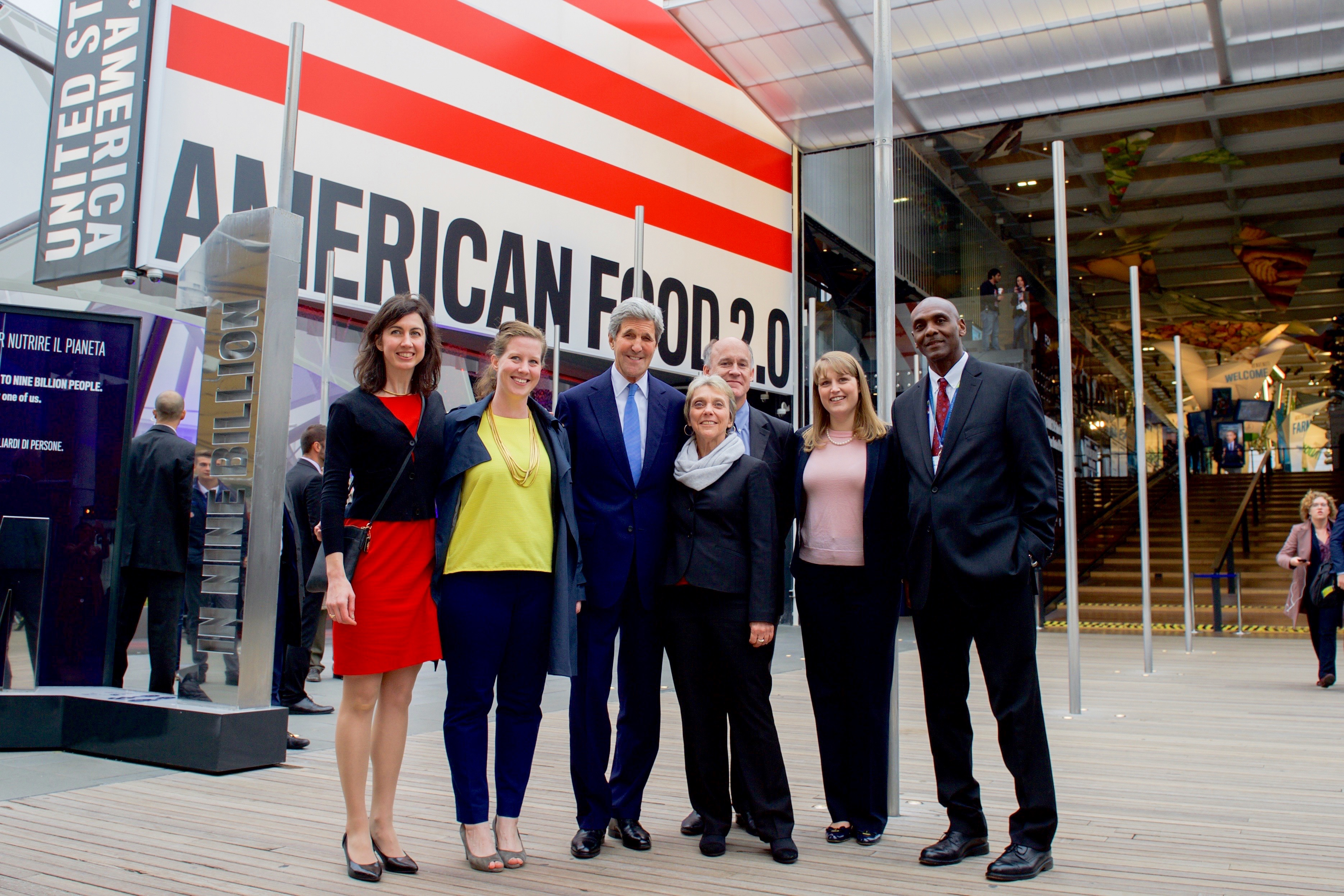
Stetson poses with Secretary Kerry and her staff at the Expo 2015

Stetson headed the U.S. Delegation to the 41st session of the Committee on World Food Security and the 42nd session of the Committee on World Food Security where she introduced the Caribbean Ocean Assets Sustainability faciliTy (COAST).

She was part of Secretary Kerry's delegation to the USA Pavilion at the Expo 2015.

Stetson was deputy head of the U.S. Delegation to the United Nations Habitat III conference on housing and sustainable urbanization in October, 2016.

Diplomatic posts
New office	United States Special Representative for Global Food Security; 2014–2017	Vacant
New office	United States Ambassador to Habitat III; 2016	Vacant
