= Public Health =

Public Health may refer to:

- Public health, promoting health through organized efforts and informed choices of society and individuals
- Public Health (journal), published by Elsevier for the Royal Society for Public Health
- Public Health, a May 22, 2014 episode of Debatten, a Norwegian television series
