= Versatilist =

A versatilist (also known as a generalizing specialist, technical craftsperson, renaissance developer, T-shaped person or master generalist) is someone who can specialize in a particular discipline and assume other roles with similar levels of ease.

The term "versatilist" was used in a 2005 article from Gartner, where it states that "Versatilists are able to apply a depth of skill to a progressively widening scope of situations and experiences, equally at ease with technical issues as with business strategy." A 2006 article by George Hayward mentioned versatilism in the Industrial Safety and Health Network publication "FDO" (For Distributors Only). George Hayward wrote articles for the publication from 1997. He died in 2009.

It is advantageous for organizations to employ versatilists because they will be able to easily redeploy these types of employees based on changes in business requirements or strategy.

To illustrate this using a mathematical concept, versatilists have a higher area under the curve rating. A person with some level of knowledge/experience in 15 knowledge areas may have a very high competency (score 5) in 3 areas, a medium level of competency (score 3) in 5 areas, an introductory level of competency (score 1) in 4 areas, and no competency (score 0) in 3 areas. This creates an area under the curve of 34. This is different from a specialist who may score very high in one area and have no competency in others. This is also different from a generalist who may score a 1 or 3 in every area.

This breadth of knowledge and experience enables faster changes to other roles.

== See also ==
- Recruitment
