= Juniata College =

Liberal arts college in Huntingdon, Pennsylvania, U.S.

Coordinates: 40°29′58″N 78°0′59″W

- Former names: Huntingdon Normal School (1876–1877); Brethren Normal School (1877–1896)
- Motto: Veritas Liberat (Latin)
- Motto in English: Truth Sets Free
- Type: Private liberal arts college
- Established: April 17, 1876; 150 years ago
- Affiliations: Church of the Brethren
- Endowment: $137.7 million (2025)
- President: James Troha
- Administrative staff: 403
- Undergraduates: 1,573
- Location: Huntingdon, Pennsylvania, United States
- Campus: 800 acres (320 ha); Rural
- Colors: Old Gold and Yale Blue
- Mascot: Eagles
- Website: juniata.edu

Juniata College (/ˌdʒuːniˈætə/) is a private liberal arts college in Huntingdon, Pennsylvania, United States. Founded in 1876 as a co-educational normal school, it was the first college started by members of the Church of the Brethren. It was originally founded as a center for vocational learning for those who could not afford formal education.

== History ==
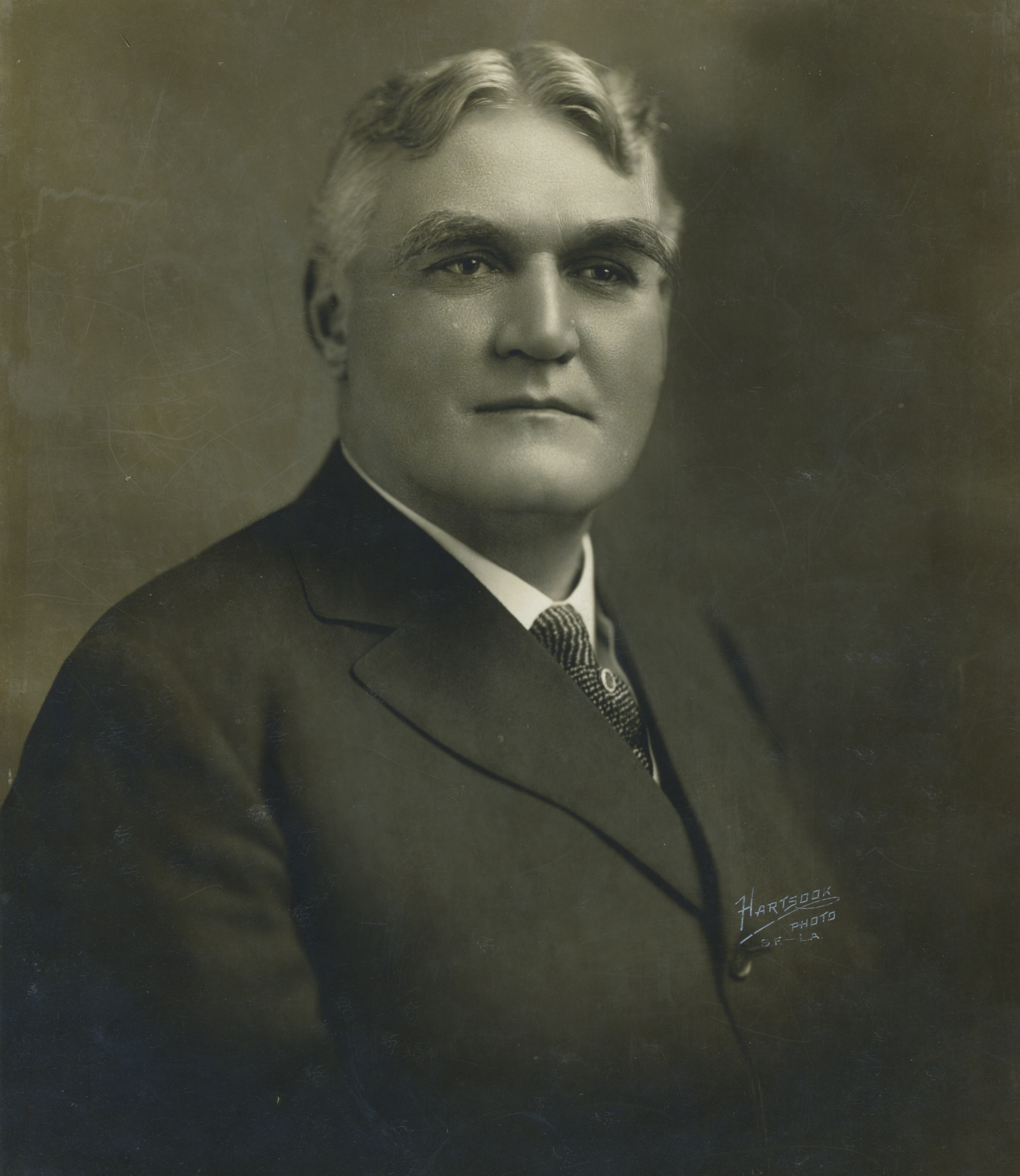
Martin Grove Brumbaugh (1862-1930), of Huntingdon County, Pennsylvania, became the third president of the recently-renamed Juniata College in 1895, serving until 1910. He later became the 26th Governor of Pennsylvania, serving 1915-1919, at the Pennsylvania State Capitol in the state capital of Harrisburg. He returned as the fifth president in 1924-1930, until his death.

=== 19th century ===
"Huntingdon Normal School", a normal school, was established by a young Huntingdon physician, Andrew B. Brumbaugh, and his two cousins, Henry and John Brumbaugh. Henry provided a second-story room over his local print shop for classes, while John lodged and fed the college's first teacher, Jacob M. Zuck. Andrew was to "provide students and furniture". Juniata's first classes were held on April 17, 1876, with professor Zuck teaching Rebecca Cornelius, Maggie D. Miller, and Gaius M. Brumbaugh (the only son of physician Andrew Brumbaugh).

In 1877, the school changed its name to the "Brethren Normal School". At this time, Zuck also discussed adding a "Scientific Course" and issuing "Certificates of Graduation". In 1879, classes were moved into Founder's Hall, the school's first permanent building on the present-day campus then only known as "The Building". On May 11 of same year, Jacob Zuck died from pneumonia at age 32, which he probably caught from sleeping in the then unfinished Founders Hall without a heater. James Quinter was then chosen to lead the school as the school's first president.

In 1894, due to a ruling at the Brethren Church's Annual Meeting against using the term "Brethren" in naming a school, the college's name was changed to "Juniata College" for the nearby Juniata River. This was made the school's legal name two decades later in 1896.

In 1895, Martin Grove Brumbaugh (1862-1930), of Huntingdon County, Pennsylvania, an 1881 graduate from the Brethren Normal (Huntingdon Normal), took over the presidency of Juniata College, leading the growing institution until 1910. He later became the 26th Governor of Pennsylvania. Governor Brumbaugh returned to Huntingdon and Juniata College in 1924 to again assume the office of college president, which he held until his death, six years later, in March 1930, while on vacation in North Carolina.

=== Presidents ===
- James Quinter (1879–1888)
- H.B. Brumbaugh (1888–1893)
- M.G. Brumbaugh (1893–1910)
- I. Harvey Brumbaugh (1910–1924)
- M. G. Brumbaugh (1924–1930)
- C.C. Ellis (1930–1943)
- Calvert N. Ellis (1943–1968)
- John N. Stauffer (1968–1975)
- Frederick M. Binder (1975–1986)
- Robert W. Neff (1986–1998)
- Thomas R. Kepple, Jr. (1998–2013)
- Jim Troha (2013–present)
- Lauren Bowen, Acting President (January 2024–June 2024)

== Campus ==
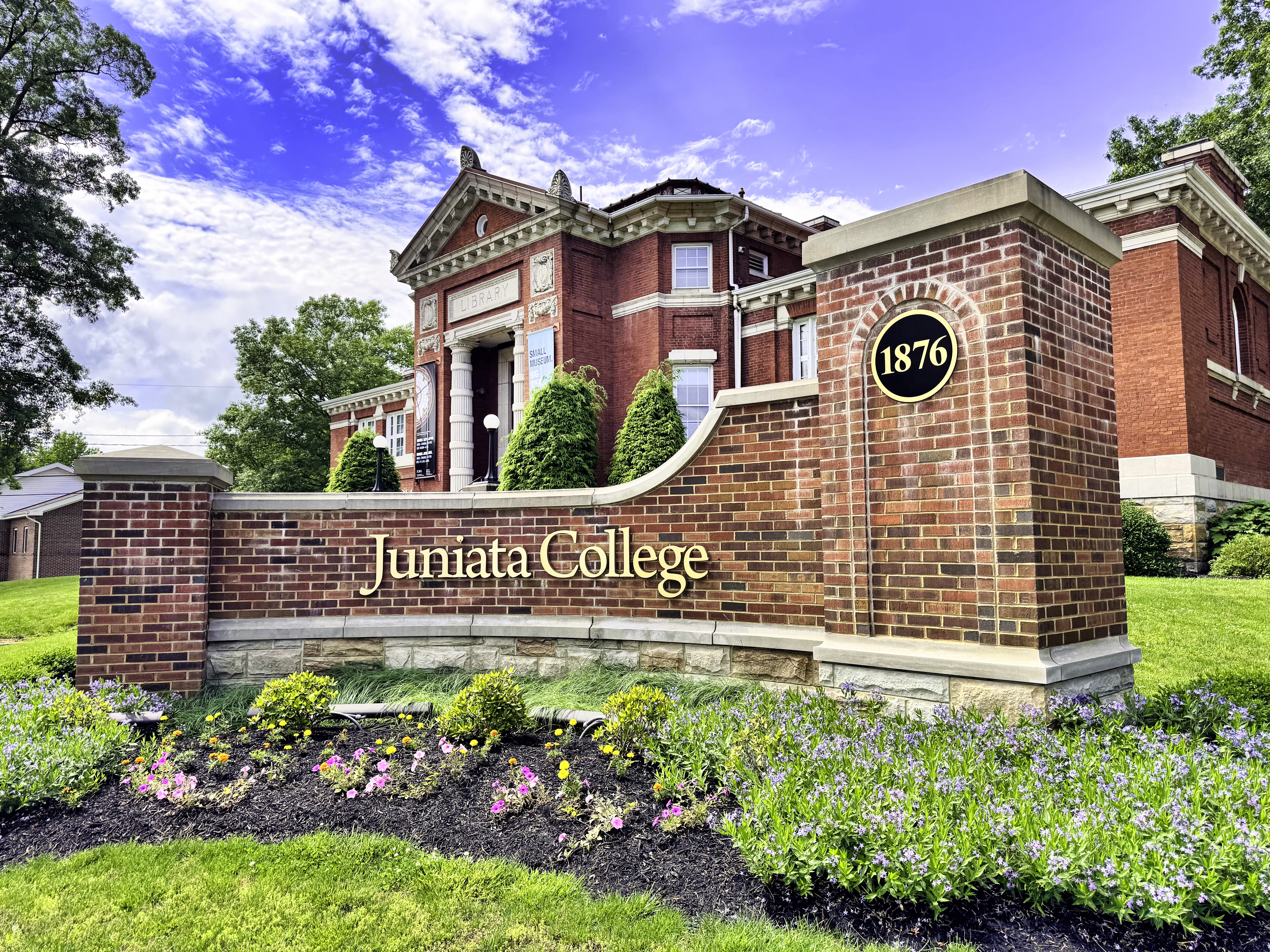
Campus sign outside the Juniata College Museum of Art, a former Carnegie Library.

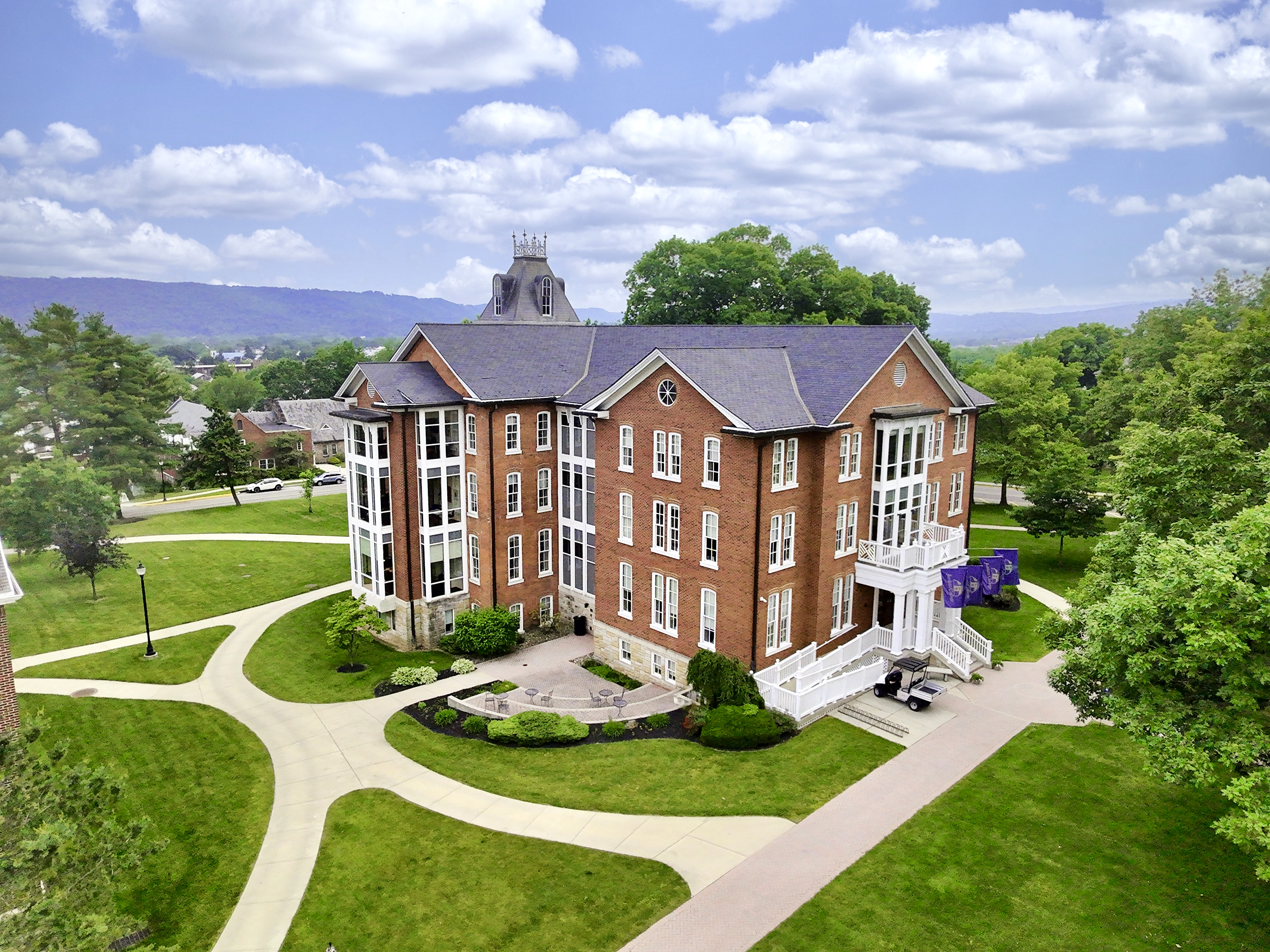
Founders Hall, the first building on campus.

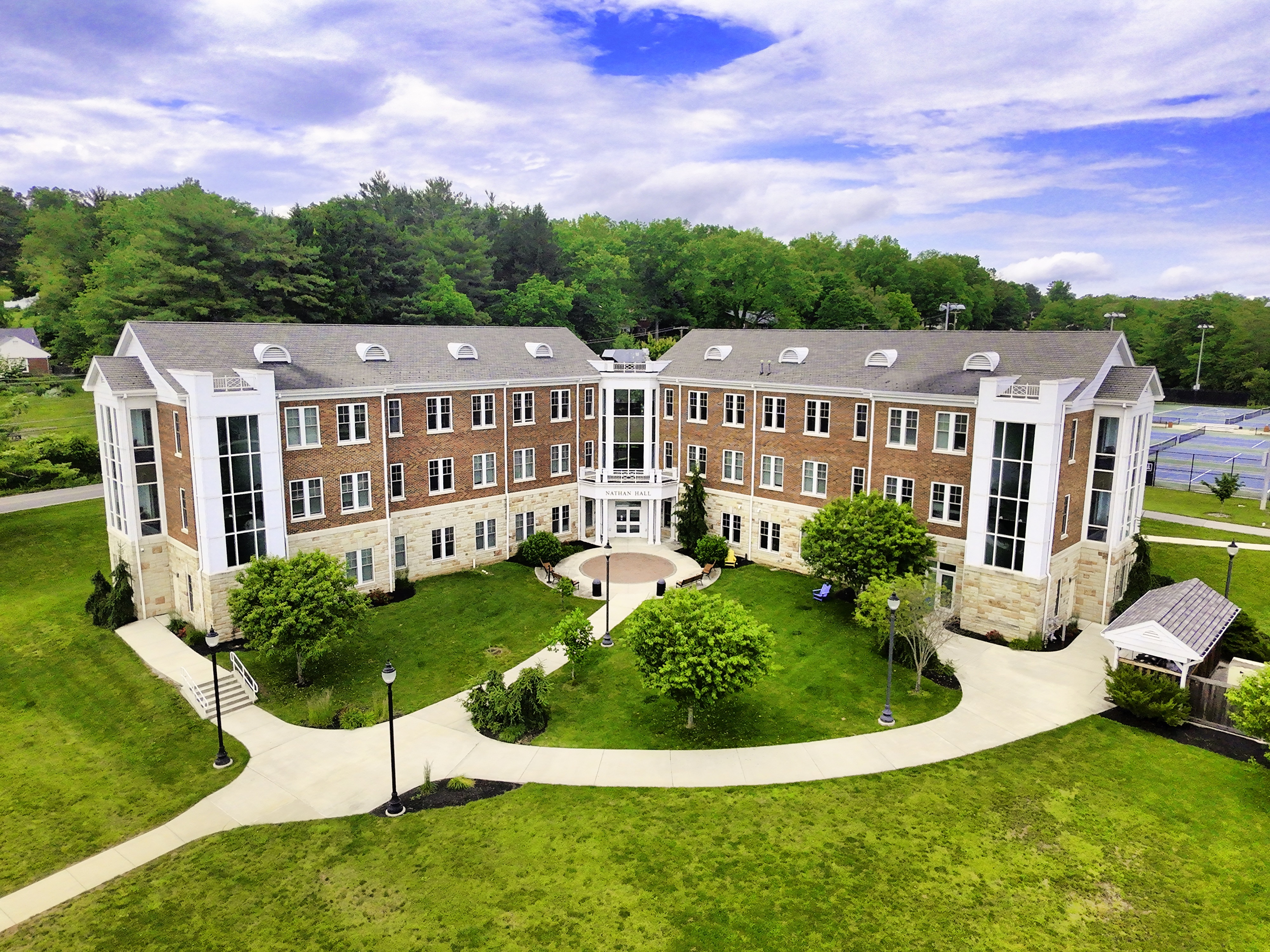
Nathan Hall dormitory.

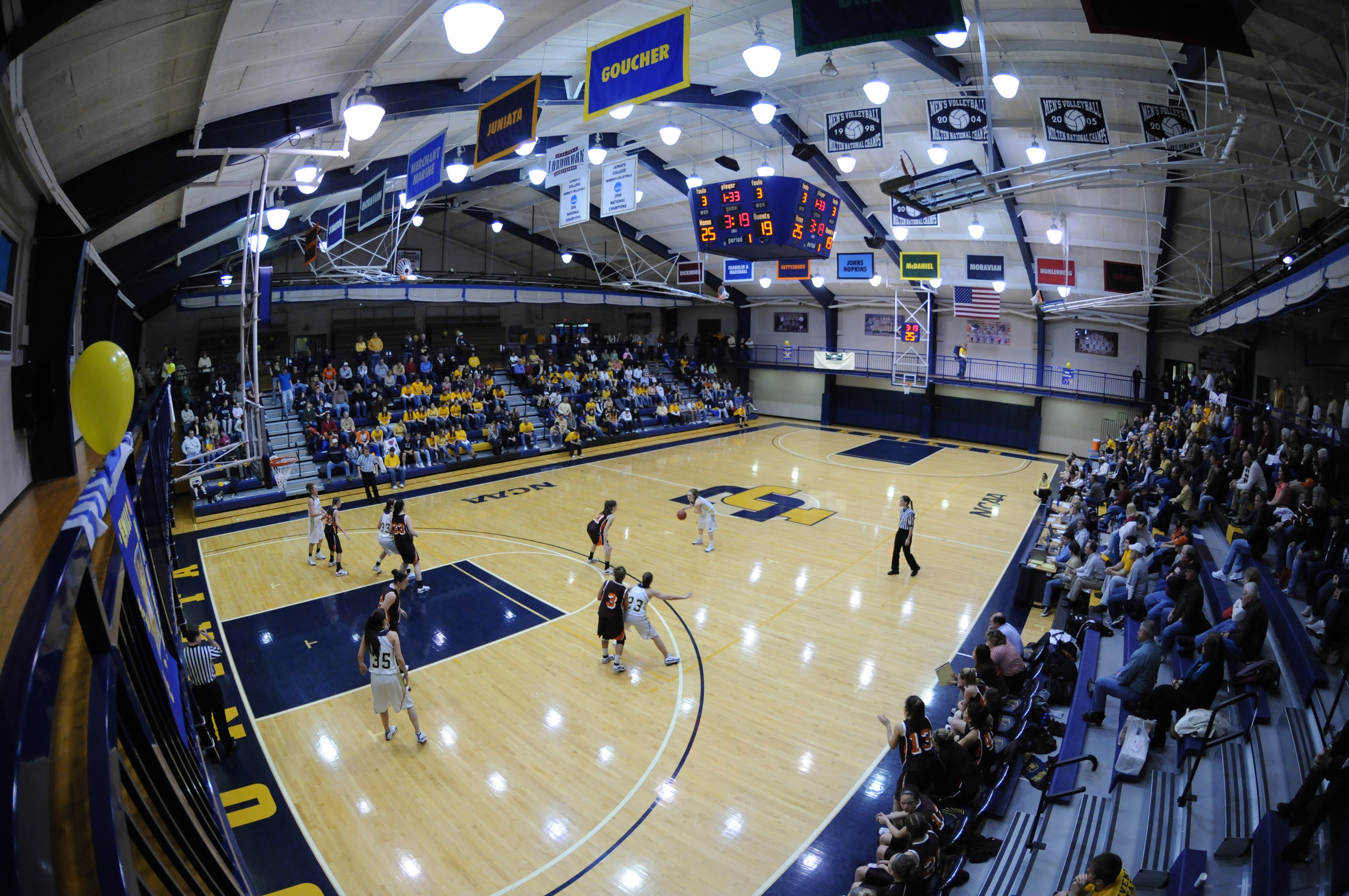
Memorial Gymnasium inside the Kennedy Sports and Recreation Center.

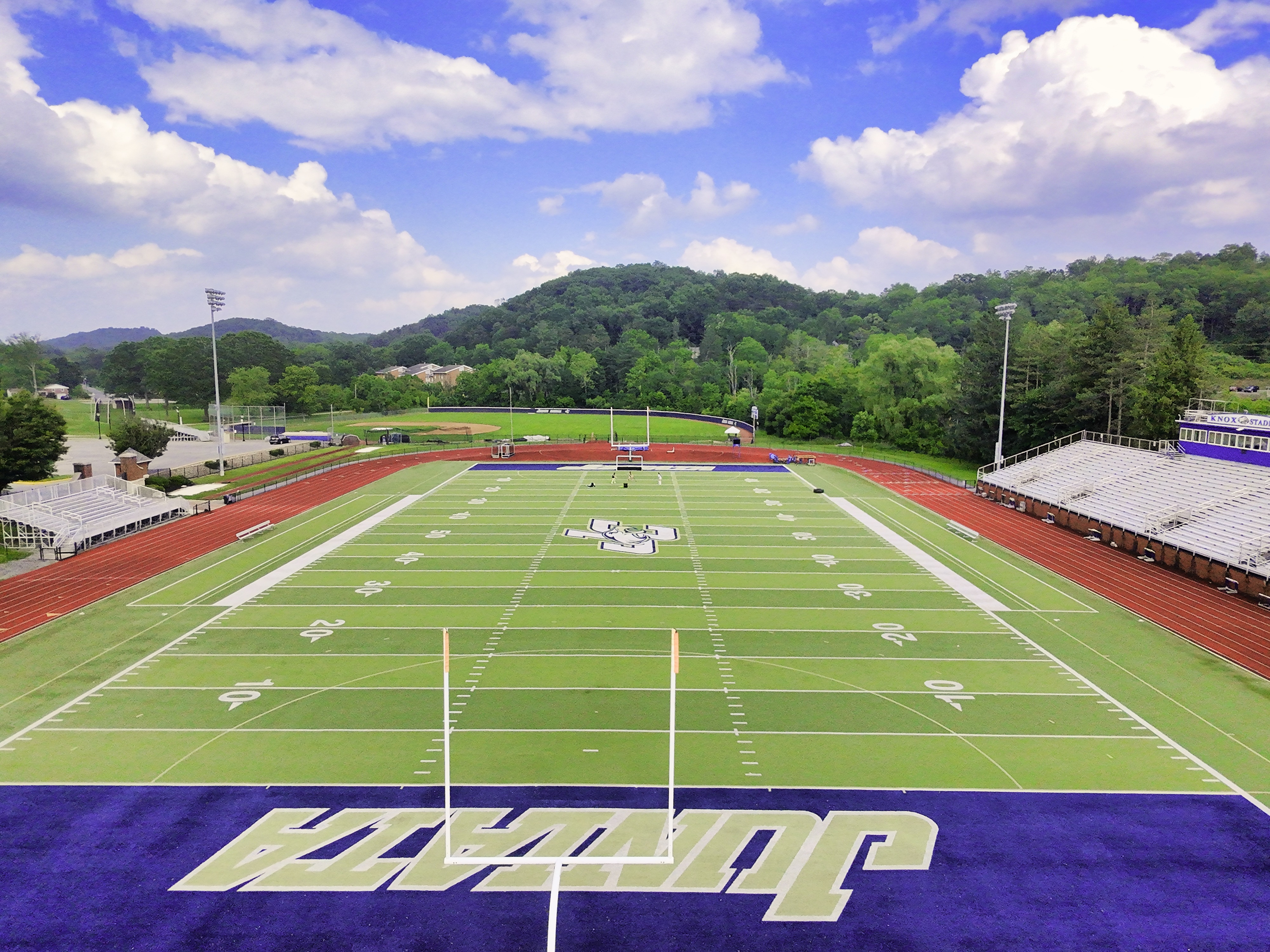
Goodman Field and Knox Stadium.

The main campus area is 110 acres (45 hectares), and the college manages a 315-acre (127-hectare) Baker-Henry Nature Preserve. Two new buildings since 2000 include the von Liebig Center for Science and the Suzanne von Liebig Theatre. Founders Hall, the first building on campus, has also been renovated recently. Construction was finished in the summer of 2009 and uses underground geothermal energy to heat and cool the building. This building is recognized as a LEED Gold building.

Other off-campus sites include the Baker Peace Chapel, designed by Maya Lin, and the cliffs, all of which have views of the Juniata River. The college also owns the Raystown Field Station, a 365-acre (148-hectare) reserve on Raystown Lake, which includes a LEED Gold building and two lodges for semester-long residential programs, often focused on environmental topics.

== Athletics ==
Juniata is a Division III collegiate sports institution. It is a charter member of the Landmark Conference, where it competes in all sports. The athletic teams are known as the Juniata Eagles.

=== Football ===
The Juniata College football program is a member of the Landmark Conference. The Goal Post Trophy goes to the winner of the annual football game with rival Susquehanna University. It is a section of the goal post that was torn down after the 1952 Juniata-Susquehanna game. The visiting Indians (now Eagles) upset the Crusaders (now River Hawks) in Selinsgrove, and Juniata fans tore down the goal post after the game.

=== Volleyball ===
Juniata College is known for both its men's and women's volleyball program. The men's volleyball team competes in the Continental Volleyball Conference; it previously competed in the Eastern Intercollegiate Volleyball Association, where it won several titles, even while under Division I and Division III sanctions.

In 2022, 2023, and 2024 the Juniata women's volleyball team won the NCAA D-III national championship. In 2023 and 2024 the Eagles completed a perfect season, going 35-0, earning the NCAA DII and DIII volleyball record for consecutive wins with 103

== Notable people ==
=== Notable alumni ===
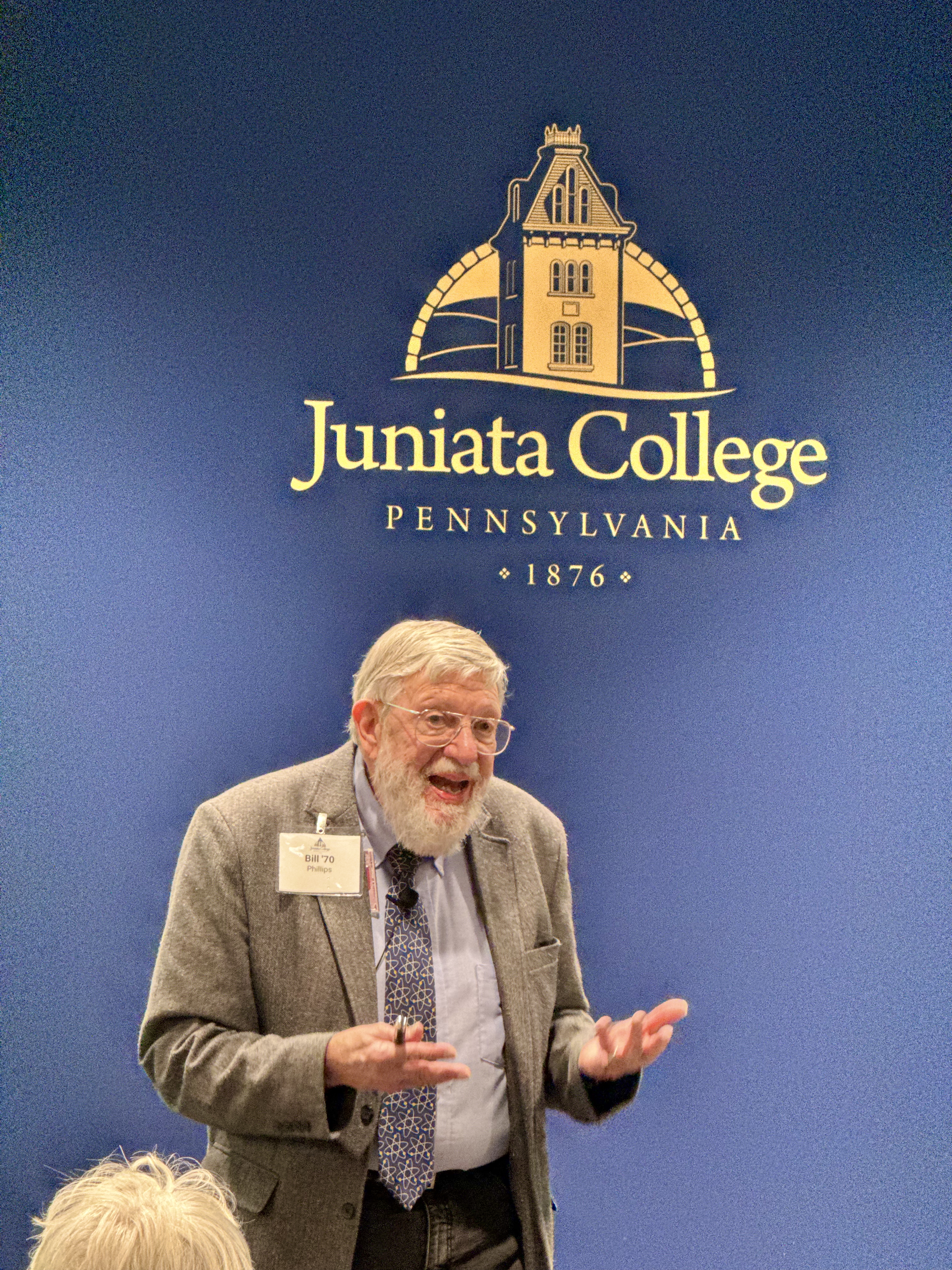
Nobel Prize laureate Bill Phillips speaks at his alma mater

Notable alumni include:

- Ronald R. Blanck, former Surgeon General of the United States Army and chairman of the board of regents at Uniformed Services University of the Health Sciences
- Heidi Cullen, chief scientist for climate central and leads, World Weather Attribution program, and former first on-air climate expert at The Weather Channel
- Francis Harvey Green, former English Department chairman, West Chester University, and Pennington School headmaster
- Janet Kauffman, novelist
- Chuck Knox, former professional football head coach, Buffalo Bills, Los Angeles Rams, and Seattle Seahawks
- John Kuriyan, 2005 Richard Lounsbery Award winner and professor, biochemistry and molecular biology at the University of California, Berkeley
- Pat Malone, former professional baseball player, Chicago Cubs and New York Yankees
- Peter Marzio, former director, Museum of Fine Arts, Houston
- Morley J. Mays, former Elizabethtown College president
- Wayne M. Meyers, former president, International Leprosy Association, physician, researcher, medical missionary, author of medical articles, book chapters, and books
- William Daniel Phillips, atomic physicist, National Institute of Standards and Technology, jointly awarded Nobel Prize in Physics in 1997 for his contributions to laser cooling
- Michael Trim, producer and cinematographer for the Showtime original series Weeds and executive producer and director of photography for the Netflix series Orange Is the New Black
- Carrie Schofield-Broadbent, Bishop of the Episcopal Church
- Frank Vogel, NBA coach, Indiana Pacers, Los Angeles Lakers, Orlando Magic, and Phoenix Suns
- Harriet Smith Windsor, former Delaware Secretary of State

=== Notable faculty and coaches ===
- Donald Deskey, art instructor who designed the interior of Radio City Music Hall and various Procter & Gamble products
- Regina Lamendella, biological sciences professor recognized for contributions to omics and microbiology
- Fayette Avery McKenzie, sociology professor during the Progressive Era who promoted adult education and aided Native Americans and Black people
- Jerry Sandusky, Penn State football coach convicted of 45 charges of sexual abuse of young boys over 15 years
- Frank Vogel, professional basketball coach
