= Pascal Saikaly =

Lebanese professor

- Born: Pascal Elias Saikaly
- Occupations: Professor of Environmental Science and Engineering
- Known for: Bioelectrochemistry

Academic background
- Education: American University of Beirut University of Cincinnati
- Thesis: Ecological Approach to Mitigate Toxic Shock Loads in Activated Sludge Systems (2005)
- Doctoral advisor: Daniel Oerther

Academic work
- Discipline: Environmental engineering
- Sub-discipline: Wastewater treatment
- Institutions: American University of Beirut King Abdullah University of Science and Technology
- Website: https://www.kaust.edu.sa/en/study/faculty/pascal-saikaly

Pascal Elias Saikaly is a Lebanese professor of Environmental Science and Engineering. He is best known for the use of omics for applied studies of microbiology in engineered and natural wastewater treatment systems, including bioelectrochemistry, membrane bioreactors, and granular sludge.

Saikaly collaborates with and leads teams of scientist and engineers who have developed novel approach to harvest electrical energy from wastewater while simultaneously producing useful byproducts. In particular, he combines advances from nanotechnology and materials research with advances from microbial ecology to develop devices to create bioelectricity. This work supports the long-term strategic efforts of the King Abdullah University of Science and Technology to research and commercialize alternative sources of energy. Saikaly's research addresses broader issues of importance in water-limited environments, including the use of seawater for toilet flushing.

== Education ==
Saikaly earned his B.S. and M.S. from the American University of Beirut. In 2005, he completed his Ph.D. at the University of Cincinnati. From 2005 to 2007, he was completed postdoctoral studies at North Carolina State University. From 2008 to 2010, he was an assistant professor at the American University of Beirut. In 2010, he joined the faculty of King Abdullah University of Science and Technology, where he is currently a full professor.

== Bibliography ==
Saikaly has more than 100 publications listed on Scopus that have been cited a total of more than 3000 times, giving him an h-index of more than 30. His most cited articles include:

- Saikaly, Pascal; Stroot, Peter; Oerther, Daniel (2005). "Use of 16S rRNA gene terminal restriction fragment analysis to assess the impact of solids retention time on the bacterial diversity of activated sludge". Applied and Environmental Microbiology. 71 (10): 5814–5822. Bibcode:2005ApEnM..71.5814S. doi:10.1128/AEM.71.10.5814-5822.2005. PMC 1265999. PMID 16204492.
- Maleb, Lilian; Le-Clech, Pierre; Vrouwenvelder, Johannes; Ayoub, George; Saikaly, Pascal (2013). "Do biological-based strategies hold promise to biofouling control in MBRs?". Water Research. 47 (15): 25447–5463. Bibcode:2013WatRe..47.5447M. doi:10.1016/j.watres.2013.06.033. PMID 23863390.
- Logan, Bruce; Wallack, Maxwell; Kim, K-Y; Hu, Weihua; Feng, Yuejeng; Saikaly, Pascal (2015). "Assessment of Microbial Fuel Cell Configurations and Power Densities". Environmental Science and Technology Letters. 2 (8): 206–214. doi:10.1021/acs.estlett.5b00180. hdl:10754/561402.
