= Index-based insurance =

Insurance method

Index-based insurance, also known as index-linked insurance, weather-index insurance or, simply, index insurance, is primarily used in agriculture. Because of the high cost of assessing losses, traditional insurance based on paying indemnities for actual losses incurred is usually not viable, particularly for smallholders in developing countries. With index-based insurance, payouts are related to an "index" that is closely correlated to agricultural production losses, such as one based on rainfall, yield or vegetation levels (e.g. pasture for livestock). Payouts are made when the index exceeds a certain threshold, often referred to as a "trigger". By making payouts according to an index instead of individual claims, providers can circumvent the transaction costs associated with claims assessments. Index-based insurance is therefore not designed to protect farmers against every peril, but only where there is a widespread risk that significantly influences a farmer's livelihood. Many such indices now make use of satellite imagery.

== Uses for index-based insurance ==
Traditional insurance schemes are susceptible to morally hazardous behaviors. To ensure that a given claim is legitimate, time and resources must be allocated to adequately audit the losses or damages incurred from an event. Index-based insurance attempts to reduce costs by circumventing the issue of moral hazard, thereby eliminating the administrative costs of claims auditing. This is possible because index-based insurance insures against risks that can not significantly be manipulated through human intervention (e.g. extreme weather). Unlike other insurance, adverse events cannot easily be predicted statistically, large numbers of people tend to be affected at the same time (known as "concurrency" by the insurance industry) and losses for each of them tend to be significant. The opposite is the case for more traditional insurance such as home theft insurance, where actuaries can make a good forecast of the likely incidence of claims, thefts are (relatively) rare, all the houses on a block are not entered at the same time, and entire contents of a house are not usually stolen.

=== Agriculture ===
Insuring risk in small-scale agriculture faces particular problems that are not usually encountered by the broader insurance sector. Production relies on natural conditions, such as rain, temperature, and sunlight, which cannot be controlled easily by poorer farmers, other than by those with access to irrigation or plastic tunnels in the case of horticultural crops. Consequently farmers face problems on a regular basis.

Traditional insurance has two cost categories. First is the underlying risk that is being insured and, second, the costs involved in operating the insurance, such as carrying out individual risk assessments and loss adjustments. In the agricultural sector these costs tend to be high and premiums are often unaffordable for most poorer farmers. The fixed costs of loss verification make it uneconomic to investigate losses for small-scale agriculture producers whose total insurance premiums are small. In practice, this can lead to poor loss verification, morally hazardous behavior and high loss ratios for insurance companies.

In theory, index-based insurance can cover many farmers while avoiding the need for loss assessment and adjustment. This can reduce some administrative and implementation costs, and also has the potential to limit payouts caused by fraud or poor farming practices.

=== Alternative uses ===
Although agriculture is the main application of index insurance, it can also be applied to other markets as a similar means of protection. Droughts and floods that cause water supply disruptions can lead to financial damage that, if not remedied quickly, can further snowball into long-term economic damage. Index-insurance could be used to cover the potential economic losses that might occur with water supply disruptions and similar perils that are heavily influenced by weather conditions.

Another unorthodox application of index-insurance is using it as a means of hedging. The use of index insurance by financial institutions and farm input suppliers who extend credit to low income farmers in developing countries may be a more cost-effective use and enable such bulk buyers of insurance to hedge against default by farmers and thus continue to deal with those who have a high risk of defaulting.

== Issues in practice ==
=== Basis risk ===
Index-based insurance does not always provide farmers with indemnities when they experience crop or animal losses and the indemnity payments sometimes do not accurately reflect the size of the losses they experience. This is because an index is based on a geographical area within which farmers may have different experiences with, e.g., rainfall. As a consequence some farmers may achieve a good crop when most others in the area experience a crop failure. However, under an index-based system all farmers receive payouts. This problem has become known as "basis risk". As a direct consequence of basis risk, farmers are usually reluctant to pay the same premiums for index-based insurance that they would for standard insurance. Reducing basis risk by incorporating newly upcoming data sources is of central interest in current research.

=== Information ===
There are considerable challenges that must be overcome to effectively service farmers in remote areas. The lack of historical rainfall data, yield data, or information on livestock mortality has complicated the development of indices, while the small size of farms, low value of crops or animals to be insured, and high costs of operation have made it difficult to design a workable scheme. Offsetting that, ICTs, particularly smartphones, are reducing costs, while increasing use of satellite measurements for the purposes of index development has also been effective.

=== Subsidies ===
Experience to date in developing countries has been that index-based insurance requires subsidies in order to be commercially viable. Subsidies usually take one of two forms: governments may support the establishment of insurance programmes through provision of data necessary to calculate indices and through assistance with promotion and training, or they may provide direct support, often by subsidizing premium payments. The question that needs to be addressed is whether such subsidies represent a good use of scarce national resources.

=== Adoption ===
Subsidies can reduce index insurance premiums to be moderately viable on the market, but there is still low uptake of the product amongst smallholders. One prominent barrier to entry is the high cost of insurance despite subsidies. This is because there is difficulty in assessing fair prices with data that is not verifiably accurate to the weather conditions that might arise. Additionally, an understanding of insurance by smallholders is difficult but necessary for adoption. Index insurance adds to this complexity because payouts may not occur even in poor-yielding seasons due to basis risk. Without ample financial literacy, smallholders often struggle to trust providers of index-based insurance.

Not dissimilar from how farmers must set postharvest cash aside for next season's fertilizers and additional equipment, farmers must also have some level of liquidity in order to satisfy premium payments. Farmers may procrastinate in purchasing their insurance and would not have adequate liquidity to find a suitable insurance product for the season. As access to credit and liquidity might be challenging for many smallholders, adoption is made more difficult. One method of combating this procrastination is by collecting insurance premiums directly after growing seasons when farmers would have the highest capacity to pay.

== See also ==
- Crop insurance
- Microinsurance
- Parametric insurance
