= Regina Lamendella =

American Professor of Microbiology

- Citizenship: United States of America
- Occupation: Professor of Biology
- Known for: Gut microbiome

Academic background
- Education: Lafayette College University of Cincinnati
- Thesis: Comparative Metagenomic Approaches to Reveal Swine-specific Populations Useful for Fecal Source Identification (2009)
- Doctoral advisor: Daniel Oerther

Academic work
- Discipline: Microbiology
- Sub-discipline: Microbial Ecology
- Institutions: Juniata College
- Website: www.juniata.edu/academics/provost/bio.php?id=LAMENDELLA

Regina Lamendella is an American Professor of Microbiology. She is best known for the use of omics for applied studies of microbiology in natural waterways and the guts of animals, including humans.

Lamendella collaborates with and leads teams of scientist and healthcare professionals developing novel approaches to identify and screen for microorganisms in diverse environments, from waterways to human tissue. For example, her work suggests that eating walnuts may be good for human gut flora, resulting in improved heart health. Lamendella has also contributed to local testing for COVID-19 among rural Amish communities.

== Education ==
Lamendella earned her B.S. in biology from Lafayette College. From the University of Cincinnati, she earned a M.S. in environmental science, and in 2009 she completed her PhD. From 2009-2012, she completed postdoctoral studies at Lawrence Berkeley National Laboratory.

== Employment ==
In 2012, Lamendella joined the faculty of Juniata College, where she is currently a Full Professor of Biology and holds the George '75 and Cynthia '76 Valko Professorship in Biological Sciences.

== Bibliography ==
Lamendella has more than 100 publications that have been cited a total of more than 13,000 times and her google scholar profile can be found here. Her most cited articles include:

- Hazen, Terry C.; Dubinsky, Eric A.; Desantis, Todd Z.; Andersen, Gary L.; Piceno, Yvette M.; Singh, Navjeet; Jansson, Janet K.; Probst, Alexander; Borglin, Sharon E.; Fortney, Julian L.; Stringfellow, William T.; Bill, Markus; Conrad, Mark E.; Tom, Lauren M.; Chavarria, Krystle L.; Alusi, Thana R.; Lamendella, Regina; Joyner, Dominique C.; Spier, Chelsea; Baelum, Jacob; Auer, Manfred; Zemla, Marcin L.; Chakraborty, Romy; Sonnenthal, Eric L.; d'Haeseleer, Patrik; Holman, Hoi-Ying N.; Osman, Shariff; Lu, Zhenmei; Van Nostrand, Joy D.; et al. (2010). "Deep-sea oil plume enriches indigenous oil-degrading bacteria". Science. 330 (6001): 204–208. Bibcode:2010Sci...330..204H. doi:10.1126/science.1195979. PMID 20736401. S2CID 12546763.
- Lamendella, Regina; Santo Domingo, Jorge; Ghosh, Shreya; Martinson, John; Oerther, Daniel (2011). "Comparative fecal metagenomics unveils unique functional capacity of the swine gut". BMC Microbiology. 11: 1003. doi:10.1186/1471-2180-11-103. PMC 3123192. PMID 21575148.
- Halfvarson, Jonas; Brislawn, Colin J.; Lamendella, Regina; Vázquez-Baeza, Yoshiki; Walters, William A.; Bramer, Lisa M.; d'Amato, Mauro; Bonfiglio, Ferdinando; McDonald, Daniel; Gonzalez, Antonio; McClure, Erin E.; Dunklebarger, Mitchell F.; Knight, Rob; Jansson, Janet K. (2017). "Dynamics of the human gut microbiome in inflammatory bowel disease". Nature Microbiology. 2 (5): 17004. doi:10.1038/nmicrobiol.2017.4. PMC 5319707. PMID 28191884.
