= Parametric derivative =

In calculus, a parametric derivative is a derivative of a dependent variable with respect to another dependent variable that is taken when both variables depend on an independent third variable, usually thought of as "time" (that is, when the dependent variables are x and y and are given by parametric equations in t).

== First derivative ==
Let x(t) and y(t) be the coordinates of the points of the curve expressed as functions of a variable t:
$$y = y(t), \quad x = x(t).$$
The first derivative implied by these parametric equations is
$$\frac{dy}{dx} = \frac{dy/dt}{dx/dt} = \frac{\dot{y}(t)}{\dot{x}(t)},$$
where the notation $\dot{x}(t)$ denotes the derivative of x with respect to t. This can be derived using the chain rule for derivatives:
$$\frac{dy}{dt} = \frac{dy}{dx} \cdot \frac{dx}{dt}$$
and dividing both sides by $\frac{dx}{dt}$ to give the equation above.

In general, all of these derivatives — dy / dt, dx / dt, and dy / dx — are themselves functions of t and so can be written more explicitly as, for example, $\frac{dy}{dx}(t)$.

== Second derivative ==
The second derivative implied by a parametric equation is given by
$$\begin{align}
\frac{d^2y}{dx^2}
&= \frac{d}{dx}\left(\frac{dy}{dx}\right) \\[1ex]
&= \frac{d}{dt}\left(\frac{dy}{dx}\right)\cdot \frac{dt}{dx} \\[1ex]
&= \frac{d}{dt} \left(\frac{\dot{y}}{\dot{x}}\right) \frac{1}{\dot{x}} \\[1ex]
&= \frac{\dot{x}\ddot{y} - \dot{y}\ddot{x}}{\dot{x}^3}
\end{align}$$
by making use of the quotient rule for derivatives. The latter result is useful in the computation of curvature.

== Example ==
For example, consider the set of functions where:
$$\begin{align}
x(t) &= 4t^2, &
y(t) &= 3t.
\end{align}$$
Differentiating both functions with respect to t leads to the functions
$$\begin{align}
\frac{dx}{dt} &= 8t, &
\frac{dy}{dt} &= 3.
\end{align}$$
Substituting these into the formula for the parametric derivative, we obtain
$$\frac{dy}{dx} = \frac{\dot{y}}{\dot{x}} = \frac{3}{8t},$$
where $\dot{x}$ and $\dot{y}$ are understood to be functions of t.

We can similarly find $\ddot{y}$.
$$\frac{d}{dt} (\dot{y}) = 0.$$
Substituting these into the formula for the second parametric derivative, we obtain
$$\begin{align}
\frac{d^2y}{dx^2}
&= \frac{(8t)(0) - (3)(8)}{(8t)^3}
&= \frac{-3}{64t^3}
\end{align}$$

== See also ==
- Generalizations of the derivative
