= Feed the Future Initiative =

Program of the United States federal government

The Feed the Future Initiative (FTF) was launched in 2010 by the United States government and the Obama Administration to address global hunger and food insecurity. According to Feed the Future, it is "the U.S. government's global hunger and food security initiative."

The Feed the Future Initiative began as an effort "to combat the global food price spikes of 2007 and 2008." In 2009, President Barack Obama committed $3.5 billion over a 3-year period to a global initiative with the intent of combating hunger and poverty; in May 2010, the United States Department of State launched the Feed the Future Initiative. The Initiative was developed by the Department of State and is coordinated primarily by the U.S. Agency for International Development (USAID). The main objectives of the initiative are the advancement of global agricultural development, increased food production and food security, and improved nutrition particularly for vulnerable populations such as women and children.

== Background ==
It is estimated that globally almost one billion people currently experience chronic hunger. Most of these people live in Sub-Saharan Africa and South East Asia where health and social problems resulting from chronic hunger are compounded by poverty and other health issues. With a world population of over seven billion people, and a predicted population of 9 billion people by 2050 global hunger and chronic malnutrition/under nutrition are expected to increase in developing countries. Based on these estimates the demand for food worldwide will increase by 40%-70% by 2050 depending on income growth in developing countries most affected by poverty and chronic health issues.

At the 2009 G8 Summit in L'Aquila, Italy, President of the United States Barack Obama announced a $10.15 billion commitment over 3 years to an initiative that would focus on reducing hunger and poverty in developing countries in Sub-Saharan Africa and South East Asia. The United States and other G8 and G-20 countries committed a total of over US$20 billion. The intent of the international commitment was to address food insecurity and poverty in a more comprehensive way; international efforts include supporting country-led plans for change, looking at root causes of food insecurity and poverty, increasing coordination with and the use of multi-lateral institutions, and approaching issues with the goal of increased sustainability and accountability

The United States' State Department, the coordinating agency for the Obama Administration's initiative on global hunger and food security, released the Global Hunger and Food Security Initiative Consultation Document on September 28, 2009. The document provided an overview of the initiative's priorities and strategy; in May 2010 the initiative was renamed "Feed the Future" and a new set of strategy documents and country and regional implementation guides were issued.

Feed the Future's guide is based on five principles for sustainable food security that were first introduced at the 2009 G8 Summit and later endorsed at the 2009 World Summit on Food Security in Rome, Italy. In creating the guide the U.S. government received input through consultation with other countries, international foundations and institutions, private companies and farmers both nationally and internationally. The Feed the Future strategy guide includes three overarching themes throughout: gender/gender development, the environment/human ecology, and climate change. The two main objectives of the Feed the Future Initiative are: to accelerate agriculture sector growth, and to improve the nutritional status of people in the FtF focus and aligned countries. The Initiative specifically focuses on using locally adapted technologies to increase agricultural productivity and improve local, national and international markets for commodities produced.

According to Feed the Future's strategy guide, the Initiative's input and effects differ for each involved country due to FtF's policy of country-specific, country-owned implementation plans. Coordination of the Initiative is carried out by host country governments, the United States government's Global Health Initiative and other development partners to create a nutrition strategy for each country. The progress of each country's nutrition plan is measured by statistics collected; the decrease of stunted and wasted children as well as the prevalence of underweight women are indicators of improved nutritional status.

== Focus countries and partnerships ==
The Feed the Future Initiative currently has 20 Target countries across three regions: sixteen countries in Africa, two countries in Asia and two countries in Latin America and the Caribbean,

- Africa: DRC, Ethiopia, Ghana, Kenya, Liberia, Madagascar, Malawi, Mali, Mozambique, Niger, Nigeria, Rwanda, Senegal, Tanzania, Uganda, Zambia
- Asia: Bangladesh and Nepal
- Latin America and the Caribbean: Guatemala and Honduras

Feed the Future countries are chosen based on five criteria established by the U.S. State Department:

- "Prevalence of chronic hunger and poverty in rural communities
- Potential for rapid and sustainable agricultural-led growth
- Opportunities for regional synergies through trade and other mechanisms
- Host government commitment, leadership, governance, and political will;
- Resource availability and commitments by host country."

The 'Global Agriculture and Food Security Program' (GAFSP) multilateral funding mechanism associated with the initiative is "housed at the World Bank.

Partner companies include Bayer, Cargill, John Deere, Mars, Monsanto, OX Delivers, PepsiCo., Olam and Starbucks

== Assessment ==
A 2013 Government Accountability Office report indicated that "without ongoing assessments of risks on the ground .. American money, goodwill, and expertise could be squandered." A critical article in Mother Jones Magazine in 2013 suggested that "it's not clear if Feed the Future is working as intended, or if its funds are falling through the cracks."

A June 2014 report released by the Feed the Future Initiative described "positive policy outcomes" in more optimistic terms, declaring that "the initiative has begun to truly establish a foundation for lasting progress against global hunger."
