= Public Health (journal) =

Monthly peer-reviewed public health journal

- Discipline: Public health
- Language: English
- Edited by: Phil Mackie, Fiona Sim

Publication details
- History: 1888-present
- Publisher: Elsevier
- Frequency: Monthly
- Open access: Supports Open Access
- Impact factor: 5.2 (2022)

Standard abbreviations
- ISO 4: Public Health

Indexing
- CODEN: PUHEAE
- ISSN: 0033-3506 (print); 1476-5616 (web)
- LCCN: 80013594 sn 80013594
- OCLC no.: 1639864

Links
- Journal homepage; Online access; Online archive

Public Health is a monthly peer-reviewed public health journal. It was established in 1888 and is published by Elsevier on behalf of the Royal Society for Public Health. The editors-in-chief are Phil Mackie (NHS Health Scotland) and Fiona Sim (National Health Service). According to the Journal Citation Reports, the journal has a 2022 impact factor of 5.2.
