= Parametric equation =

Representation of a curve by a function of a parameter

The butterfly curve can be defined by parametric equations of x and y.

In mathematics, a parametric equation expresses several quantities, such as the coordinates of a point, as functions of one or more variables called parameters.

In the case of a single parameter, parametric equations are commonly used to express the trajectory of a moving point. For this case, the parameter is often, but not necessarily, time, and the point describes a curve, called a parametric curve. In the case of two parameters, the point describes a surface, called a parametric surface. In all cases, the equations are collectively called a parametric representation, or parametric system, or parameterization (also spelled parametrization, parametrisation) of the object.

For example, the equations
$$\begin{align}
x &= \cos t \\
y &= \sin t
\end{align}$$
form a parametric representation of the unit circle, where t is the parameter: A point (x, y) is on the unit circle if and only if there is a value of t such that these two equations generate that point. Sometimes the parametric equations for the individual scalar output variables are combined into a single parametric equation in vectors:

$$(x, y)=(\cos t, \sin t).$$

Parametric representations are generally not unique (see § Parametric plane curves), so the same quantities may be expressed by a number of different parameterizations.

In addition to curves and surfaces, parametric equations can describe manifolds and algebraic varieties of higher dimension, with the number of parameters being equal to the dimension of the manifold or variety, and the number of equations being equal to the dimension of the space in which the manifold or variety is considered (for curves the dimension is one and one parameter is used, for surfaces dimension two and two parameters, etc.).

Parametric equations are commonly used in kinematics, where the trajectory of an object is represented by equations depending on time as the parameter. Because of this application, a single parameter is often labeled t; however, parameters can represent other physical quantities (such as geometric variables) or can be selected arbitrarily for convenience. Parameterizations are non-unique; more than one set of parametric equations can specify the same curve.

== Implicitization ==
Converting a set of parametric equations to a single implicit equation involves eliminating the variable t from the simultaneous equations $x=f(t),\ y=g(t).$ This process is called 'implicitization'. If one of these equations can be solved for t, the expression obtained can be substituted into the other equation to obtain an equation involving x and y only: Solving $y=g(t)$ to obtain $t=g^{-1}(y)$ and using this in $x=f(t)$ gives the explicit equation $x=f(g^{-1}(y)),$ while more complicated cases will give an implicit equation of the form $h(x,y)=0.$

If the parametrization is given by rational functions
$$x=\frac{p(t)}{r(t)},\qquad y=\frac{q(t)}{r(t)},$$

where p, q, and r are set-wise coprime polynomials, a resultant computation allows one to implicitize. More precisely, the implicit equation is the resultant with respect to t of xr(t) – p(t) and yr(t) – q(t).

In higher dimensions (either more than two coordinates or more than one parameter), the implicitization of rational parametric equations may by done with Gröbner basis computation; see Gröbner basis § Implicitization in higher dimension.

To take the example of the circle of radius a, the parametric equations
$$\begin{align}
x &= a \cos(t) \\
y &= a \sin(t)
\end{align}$$

can be implicitized in terms of x and y by way of the Pythagorean trigonometric identity. With

$$\begin{align}
\frac{x}{a} &= \cos(t) \\
\frac{y}{a} &= \sin(t) \\
\end{align}$$
and
$$\cos(t)^2 + \sin(t)^2 = 1,$$
we get
$$\left(\frac{x}{a}\right)^2 + \left(\frac{y}{a}\right)^2 = 1,$$
and thus
$$x^2+y^2=a^2,$$

which is the standard equation of a circle centered at the origin.

== Parametric plane curves ==
=== Parabola ===
The simplest equation for a parabola,
$$y = x^2$$

can be (trivially) parameterized by using a free parameter t, and setting
$$x = t, y = t^2 \quad \mathrm{for} -\infty < t < \infty.$$

=== Explicit equations ===
More generally, any curve given by an explicit equation
$$y = f(x)$$

can be (trivially) parameterized by using a free parameter t, and setting
$$x = t, y = f(t) \quad \mathrm{for} -\infty < t < \infty.$$

=== Circle ===
A more sophisticated example is the following. Consider the unit circle which is described by the ordinary (Cartesian) equation
$$x^2 + y^2 = 1.$$

This equation can be parameterized as follows:
$$(x,y)=(\cos(t),\; \sin(t))\quad\text{ for } 0\leq t < 2\pi.$$

With the Cartesian equation it is easier to check whether a point lies on the circle or not. With the parametric version it is easier to obtain points on a plot.

In some contexts, parametric equations involving only rational functions (that is fractions of two polynomials) are preferred, if they exist. In the case of the circle, such a rational parameterization is
$$\begin{align}
x &= \frac{1 - t^2}{1 + t^2} \\[6pt]
y &= \frac{2t}{1 + t^2}\,.
\end{align}$$

With this pair of parametric equations, the point (−1, 0) is not represented by a real value of t, but by the limit of x and y when t tends to infinity.

=== Ellipse ===
An ellipse in canonical position (center at origin, major axis along the x-axis) with semi-axes a and b can be represented parametrically as
$$\begin{align}
x &= a\,\cos t \\
y &= b\,\sin t\,.
\end{align}$$

An ellipse in general position can be expressed as
$$\begin{alignat}{4}
x ={}&& X_\mathrm{c} &+ a\,\cos t\,\cos \varphi {}&&- b\,\sin t\,\sin\varphi \\
y ={}&& Y_\mathrm{c} &+ a\,\cos t\,\sin \varphi {}&&+ b\,\sin t\,\cos\varphi
\end{alignat}$$

as the parameter t varies from 0 to 2π. Here (X_{c} , Y_{c}) is the center of the ellipse, and φ is the angle between the x-axis and the major axis of the ellipse.

Both parameterizations may be made rational by using the tangent half-angle formula and setting $\tan\frac{t}{2} = u\,.$

=== Lissajous curve ===
A Lissajous curve where k_{x} = 3 and k_{y} = 2.

A Lissajous curve is similar to an ellipse, but the x and y sinusoids are not in phase. In canonical position, a Lissajous curve is given by
$$\begin{align}
x &=  a\,\cos(k_xt) \\
y &=  b\,\sin(k_yt)
\end{align}$$
where k_{x} and k_{y} are constants describing the number of lobes of the figure.

=== Hyperbola ===
An east-west opening hyperbola can be represented parametrically by

$$\begin{align}
x &= a\sec t + h \\
y &= b\tan t + k\,,
\end{align}$$

or, rationally

$$\begin{align}
x &= a\frac{1 + t^2}{1 - t^2} + h \\
y &= b\frac{2t}{1 - t^2}  + k\,.
\end{align}$$

A north-south opening hyperbola can be represented parametrically as

$$\begin{align}
x &= b\tan t + h \\
y &= a\sec t + k\,,
\end{align}$$

or, rationally

$$\begin{align}
x &= b\frac{2t}{1 - t^2} + h \\
y &= a\frac{1 + t^2}{1 - t^2} + k\,.
\end{align}$$

In all these formulae (h , k) are the center coordinates of the hyperbola, a is the length of the semi-major axis, and b is the length of the semi-minor axis. Note that in the rational forms of these formulae, the points (−a , 0) and (0 , −a), respectively, are not represented by a real value of t, but are the limit of x and y as t tends to infinity.

=== Hypotrochoid ===
A hypotrochoid is a curve traced by a point attached to a circle of radius r rolling around the inside of a fixed circle of radius R, where the point is at a distance d from the center of the interior circle.

A hypotrochoid for which r = d

A hypotrochoid for which R = 5, r = 3, d = 5

The parametric equations for the hypotrochoids are:

$$\begin{align}
x (\theta) &= (R - r)\cos\theta + d\cos\left({R - r \over r}\theta\right) \\
y (\theta) &= (R - r)\sin\theta - d\sin\left({R - r \over r}\theta\right)\,.
\end{align}$$

Some examples:

R = 6 r = 4 d = 1

R = 7 r = 4 d = 1

R = 8 r = 3 d = 2

R = 7 r = 4 d = 2

R = 15 r = 14 d = 1

== Parametric space curves ==
Animated Parametric helix

=== Helix ===
Parametric helix

Parametric equations are convenient for describing curves in higher-dimensional spaces. For example:

$$\begin{align}
x &= a \cos(t) \\
y &= a \sin(t) \\
z &= bt\,
\end{align}$$

describes a three-dimensional curve, the helix, with a radius of a and rising by 2πb units per turn. The equations are identical in the plane to those for a circle. Such expressions as the one above are commonly written as

$$\begin{align}
\mathbf{r}(t) &= (x(t), y(t), z(t)) \\
&= (a \cos(t), a \sin(t), b t)\,,
\end{align}$$

where r is a three-dimensional vector.

=== Parametric surfaces ===
A torus with major radius R and minor radius r may be defined parametrically as

$$\begin{align}
x &= \cos(t)\left(R + r \cos(u)\right), \\
y &= \sin(t)\left(R + r \cos(u)\right), \\
z &= r \sin(u)\,.
\end{align}$$

where the two parameters t and u both vary between 0 and 2π.

R = 2, r = 1/2

As u varies from 0 to 2π, the point on the surface moves about a short circle passing through the hole in the torus. As t varies from 0 to 2π, the point on the surface moves about a long circle around the hole in the torus.

=== Straight line ===
The parametric equation of the line through the point $\left( x_0, y_0, z_0 \right)$ and parallel to the vector $a \hat\mathbf{i} + b \hat\mathbf{j} + c \hat\mathbf{k}$ is

$$\begin{align}
x & = x_0 +a t \\
y & = y_0 +b t \\
z & = z_0 +c t
\end{align}$$

== Applications ==
=== Kinematics ===
In kinematics, objects' paths through space are commonly described as parametric curves, with each spatial coordinate depending explicitly on an independent parameter (usually time). Used in this way, the set of parametric equations for the object's coordinates collectively constitute a vector-valued function for position. Such parametric curves can then be integrated and differentiated termwise. Thus, if a particle's position is described parametrically as
$$\mathbf{r}(t) = (x(t), y(t), z(t))\,,$$

then its velocity can be found as
$$\begin{align}
\mathbf{v}(t) &= \mathbf{r}'(t) \\
&= (x'(t), y'(t), z'(t))\,,
\end{align}$$

and its acceleration as
$$\begin{align}
\mathbf{a}(t) &= \mathbf{v}'(t) = \mathbf{r}''(t) \\
&= (x''(t), y''(t), z''(t))\,.
\end{align}$$

=== Computer-aided design ===
Another important use of parametric equations is in the field of computer-aided design (CAD). For example, consider the following three representations, all of which are commonly used to describe planar curves.

Type	Form	Example	Description
Explicit	$y = f(x) \,\!$	$y = mx + b \,\!$	Line
Implicit	$f(x,y) = 0 \,\!$	$\left(x - a \right)^2 + \left( y - b \right)^2=r^2$	Circle
Parametric	$x = \frac{g(t)}{w(t)}; \,\!$ $y = \frac{h(t)}{w(t)}$	$x = a_0 + a_1t; \,\!$ $y = b_0 + b_1t\,\!$	Line
Parametric	$x = \frac{g(t)}{w(t)}; \,\!$ $y = \frac{h(t)}{w(t)}$	$x = a+r\,\cos t; \,\!$ $y = b+r\,\sin t\,\!$	Circle

Each representation has advantages and drawbacks for CAD applications.

The explicit representation may be very complicated, or even may not exist. Moreover, it does not behave well under geometric transformations, and in particular under rotations. On the other hand, as a parametric equation and an implicit equation may easily be deduced from an explicit representation, when a simple explicit representation exists, it has the advantages of both other representations.

Implicit representations may make it difficult to generate points on the curve, and even to decide whether there are real points. On the other hand, they are well suited for deciding whether a given point is on a curve, or whether it is inside or outside of a closed curve.

Such decisions may be difficult with a parametric representation, but parametric representations are best suited for generating points on a curve, and for plotting it.

=== Integer geometry ===
Numerous problems in integer geometry can be solved using parametric equations. A classical such solution is Euclid's parametrization of right triangles such that the lengths of their sides a, b and their hypotenuse c are coprime integers. As a and b are not both even (otherwise a, b and c would not be coprime), one may exchange them to have a even, and the parameterization is then

$$\begin{align}
a &= 2mn \\
b &= m^2 - n^2 \\
c &= m^2 + n^2\,,
\end{align}$$

where the parameters m and n are positive coprime integers that are not both odd.

By multiplying a, b and c by an arbitrary positive integer, one gets a parametrization of all right triangles whose three sides have integer lengths.

== Underdetermined linear systems ==
A system of m linear equations in n unknowns is underdetermined if it has more than one solution. This occurs when the matrix of the system and its augmented matrix have the same rank r and r < n. In this case, one can select n − r unknowns as parameters and represent all solutions as a parametric equation where all unknowns are expressed as linear combinations of the selected ones. That is, if the unknowns are $x_1, \ldots, x_n,$ one can reorder them for expressing the solutions as

$$\begin{align}
x_1 &= \beta_1+\sum_{j=r+1}^n \alpha_{1,j}x_j\\
\vdots\\
x_r &= \beta_r+\sum_{j=r+1}^n \alpha_{r,j}x_j\\
x_{r+1} &= x_{r+1}\\
\vdots\\
x_n &= x_n.
\end{align}$$

Such a parametric equation is called a 'parametric form' of the solution of the system.

The standard method for computing a parametric form of the solution is to use Gaussian elimination for computing a reduced row echelon form of the augmented matrix. Then the unknowns that can be used as parameters are the ones that correspond to columns not containing any leading entry (that is the left most non zero entry in a row or the matrix), and the parametric form can be straightforwardly deduced.

== See also ==
- Bézier curve
- Curve
- Integral curve
- Parametrization by arc length
- Parametric derivative
- Parametric estimating
- Position vector
- Vector-valued function
