= Convergence research =

Approach to solving problems

Convergence research aims to solve complex problems employing transdisciplinarity. While academic disciplines are useful for identifying and conveying coherent bodies of knowledge, some problems require collaboration among disciplines, including both enhanced understanding of scientific phenomena as well as resolving social issues. The two defining characteristics of convergence research include: 1) the nature of the problem, and 2) the collaboration among disciplines.

== Definition ==
In 2002, it was published the foundational report "Converging Technologies for Improving Human Performance: Nanotechnology, Biotechnology, Information Technology, and Cognitive Science" (Roco et al. 2002 and 2003) and article "Coherence and Divergence of Megatrends in Science and Engineering" (Roco MC, 2002), followed by the international report "Convergence of Knowledge, Technology and Society: Beyond Convergence of Nano-Bio- Info-Cognitive Technologies" (Roco et al. 2013) and "Principles and Methods that Facilitate Convergence" (Roco 2016).

In 2016, convergence research was identified by the National Science Foundation as one of 10 Big Idea's for future investments. As defined by NSF, convergence research has two primary characteristics, namely:

- "Research driven by a specific and compelling problem. Convergence research is generally inspired by the need to address a specific challenge or opportunity, whether it arises from deep scientific questions or pressing societal needs.
- Deep integration across disciplines. As experts from different disciplines pursue common research challenges, their knowledge, theories, methods, data, research communities and languages become increasingly intermingled or integrated. New frameworks, paradigms or even disciplines can form sustained interactions across multiple communities."

National Research Council published a report on "Convergence: Facilitating Transdisciplinary Integration of Life Sciences, Physical Sciences, Engineering, and Beyond" in 2014.

An illustration of implementing convergence principles to the National Nanotechnology Initiative is described in in 2013.

An illustration of application of convergence to health, science and engineering research is described in in 2016.

== Examples of convergence research ==
=== Biomedicine ===
Advancing healthcare and promoting wellness to the point of providing personalized medicine will increase health and reduce costs for everyone. While recognizing the potential benefits of personalized medicine, critics cite the importance of maintaining investments in public health as highlighted by the approaches to combat the COVID-19 pandemic.

=== Cyber-physical systems ===
The internet of things allows all people, machines, and infrastructure to be monitored, maintained, and operated in real-time, everywhere. Because the United States Government is one of the largest user of "things", cybersecurity is critical to any effective system.

=== STEMpathy ===
Jobs that utilize skills in science, technology, engineering, and mathematics to provide care for human welfare through the use of empathy have been described as creating value with "hired hearts". Thomas Friedman coined the term "STEMpathy" to describe these jobs.

=== Sustainability ===
Beyond recycling, the goal of achieving zero waste means designing a closed loop of the material and energy necessary to operate the built environment. Individuals and organizations, including corporations and governments, increasingly are committing to achieving zero waste.

Sustainability in the long-run depends on cooperation among scientists, governments, industries, and communities. This article shows how well all these people have came together to show the importance of staying together.

=== V-shaped professional ===
While an expert demonstrates a depth of knowledge in a particular area, and T-shaped skills combine depth with collaboration, the concept of V-shaped professionalism describes practitioners who hold two parallel disciplinary depths converging at a shared problem horizon, or what artists call a vanishing point. The framework is grounded in the National Science Foundation's definition of convergence research and applies the model to specific cross-disciplinary professional formations.

Two prototype V-shaped professional roles have been articulated in the peer-reviewed literature. The Nurse+Engineer has been described as a prototype V-shaped professional where "the engineer attempts to bend the future to the vision of the engineer through design, and the nurse bends himself, herself, or themself to care for the patient through empathy." The humanitarian technologist has been described as a second prototype, applying the same framework to professionals who integrate engineering and humanitarian practice in support of sustainable development and disaster risk reduction. The framework has been cited in nursing-engineering interdisciplinary methodological literature and in nursing-education scholarship internationally.
