= T-shaped skills =

Combination of specialization in an area and familiarity in other areas

The concept of T-shaped skills, or T-shaped persons is a metaphor used in job recruitment to describe the abilities of persons in the workforce. The vertical bar on the letter T represents the depth of related skills and expertise in a single field, whereas the horizontal bar is the ability to collaborate across disciplines with experts in other areas and to apply knowledge in areas of expertise other than one's own.

The earliest popular reference is by David Guest in 1995. Tim Brown, CEO of the IDEO design consultancy, endorsed this approach to résumé assessment as a method to build interdisciplinary work teams for creative processes. Earlier references can be found; in the 1980s the term "T-shaped man" was used internally by McKinsey & Company for recruiting and developing consultants and partners, both male and female.

The term T-shaped skills is also common in the agile software development world and refers to the need for cross-skilled developers and testers in an agile team, e.g. a scrum team.

== Skills of various shapes ==
Other shapes have also been proposed:

- X-shaped for leadership
- I-shaped for individual depth-skill without communication skills
- tree-shaped for a person with depth in many areas or branches of a field

Γ- and Μ-shaped individuals (gamma and mu, respectively) have been described by Brittany Fiore in her ethnographic work of data science research communities to indicate people with supporting strengths in computationally- and software-intensive fields.

Similarly, π-shaped skills (after the Greek letter pi) refer to "a broad mastery of general management skills atop a few spikes of deep functional or domain expertise".

V-shaped professionals, described in the convergence research literature, hold two parallel disciplinary depths converging at a shared problem horizon, or vanishing point; the Nurse+Engineer and the humanitarian technologist have been proposed as prototypes.

== See also ==
- Recruitment – Process of attracting and selecting candidates for a job
- Solution stack – Set of software subsystems or components needed to create a complete platform

developers are expected to work in all subsystems
