= Royal Society for Public Health =

Independent, multi-disciplinary charity

- Members: 6,000
- President: Kamlesh Patel, Baron Patel of Bradford
- Award: Fellow of the Royal Society for Public Health (FRSPH)
- Website: https://www.rsph.org.uk/

Royal Society for Public Health (RSPH) is an independent, multi-disciplinary charity concerned with the improvement of the public's health.

RSPH's chief executive is William Roberts, while its president is Kamlesh Patel, Baron Patel of Bradford; vice presidents are Natasha Kaplinsky, Bola Owolabi and Michael Sheen. It has a Royal Charter, and is governed by a Council of Trustees, all of whom are RSPH members.

Patron of the RSPH is King Charles III.

== History ==
The Sanitary Institute was established in 1876 following the landmark Public Health Act 1875. In 1904, it was tagged Royal Sanitary Institute which name it held until 1955. The Sanitary Institute was created during a period of great change within the areas of public health provision and sanitary reform to which it contributed significantly.

During its first fifty years, the (Royal) Sanitary Institute became the leading public health organization both in the United Kingdom and the rest of the world. It was soon renowned for events and conferences on pioneering and topical issues, and developed qualifications for people working in public health professions. It established a meat and food inspection course in 1896, and in 1899 a separate meat inspectors examination.

In 1955, the name was changed to Royal Society of Health. By the 1950s, the society was a leading authority in its field, and was regularly consulted by governments and the international press on health-related issues. Since the 1970s, the society has focused its activities on the most successful areas of its work: examinations, certification, and the journals Public Health and Perspectives in Public Health.

RSPH was formed with the merger of Royal Society of Health and Royal Institute of Public Health in October 2008, under a previous chief executive, Richard Parish, . Royal Society of Health was also known as the Royal Society for the Promotion of Health.

Today, RSPH is the longest-established public health organisation in the United Kingdom. It is incorporated by Royal Charter completely independent of government and of any special interest. Members are academics, health professionals and practitioners who share an interest in promoting health through their daily work, and come together through RSPH membership to provide cross-cutting, multi-disciplinary perspectives on current health questions.

== Membership ==
RSPH has a membership of over 5,000 public health professionals, with representation from over 90 countries worldwide, encompassing a wide range of sectors and roles including health promotion, medicine, environmental health and food safety trainers.

Official Membership is open to anyone working in the area of public health or with an interest in it. It is a considered a mark of commitment to public health and brings professional benefits.

There are four grades of RSPH membership, each aimed at supporting public health professionals at the different stages of their careers: Student; Associate (AMRSPH); Member (MRSPH); and Fellow (FRSPH).

== Qualifications ==
RSPH provides a wide range of vocationally related qualifications. Around 40,000 students qualify through a network of UK-wide registered training centres in qualifications in the following subjects:

- Anatomical pathology technology
- Built environment
- Emergency planning
- Food safety
- HACCP
- Health and safety
- Health improvement
- Meat inspection
- Nutrition
- Pest control
- Practice management
- Young Health Champions

Recognised and regulated to award accredited qualifications by the Office of the Qualifications and Examinations Regulator (Ofqual), Qualifications Wales and the Council for the Curriculum, Examinations and Assessment (CCEA).

== Conferences and training ==
RSPH hosts an annual programme of conferences, webinars, events and training in subjects including water hygiene, infection control, food safety and mental wellbeing. RSPH also runs a two-week intensive preparation course for the Faculty of Occupational Medicine's Diploma exam.

== Accreditation ==
RSPH has been running accreditation services continuously since 1904, endorsing products, services and more recently campaigns, which contribute to improvements in hygiene, public health and safety.

It has three accreditation services: one for campaigns, one for training programmes and one for university modules, which are either in-house or provided by third sector organisations. The common theme is maintaining high standards of hygiene, public health and safety.

== Campaigning ==
Public health encompasses all aspects of health protection and health promotion and this is reflected throughout RSPH's projects, policy work, reports and campaigns.

Campaigns include:

- Health on the High Street. The objective of this campaign was to help businesses and local authorities to improve the health of their communities.
- Life on Debt Row. Backed by a report examining the effect of debt on health and wellbeing, this campaign called for action from the UK government and industry to protect the health and wellbeing of credit users.
- #StatusOfMind. Supported by a report examining the positive and negative effects of social media on young people's health, this campaign called for action from government, social media companies and policy makers to help promote the positive aspects of social media for young people, whilst mitigating the potential negatives.
- Taking a New Line on Drugs. With reference to the wider ‘drugscape’ of legal drugs such as alcohol and tobacco, the report underpinning this campaign sets out a new vision for a holistic public health-led approach to drugs policy at a UK-wide level.
- #LidonLoots. The RSPH-led Gambling Health Alliance called for loot boxes in video games to be classed as a form of gambling.

== Programmes ==
RSPH works with a range of national and regional partners to develop, support and implement programmes and initiatives aimed at supporting the public's health and wellbeing.

== Alliances ==
RSPH leads Gambling Health Alliance, which brings together organisations and individuals who have a shared interest in reducing the damage caused to health and wellbeing from gambling.

== Journals ==
RSPH publishes three peer-reviewed journals on public health, Perspectives in Public Health, Public Health and Public Health in Practice.

- Public Health. Public Health is one of the world's oldest public health journals, having been in continuous publication since 1888. Public Health publishes original research papers and reviews on all aspects of public health and is aimed at public health practitioners and researchers. It has an International Editorial Board made up of a distinguished panel of public health experts from around the world.
- Perspectives in Public Health. Perspectives in Public Health combines peer-reviewed research and reviews with practice-based current topic and opinion articles, news, case studies, book reviews, and updates on our latest work. It has both an editorial board and an International Advisory Board.
- Public Health in Practice. Public Health in Practice is a gold open-access journal in the field of population health, and the sister journal to Public Health.

== See also ==
- Health education
- Health promotion
