= Parametric animation =

Parametric animation is an animation technique used in video game graphics that combines two or more separate animations together to form a new composite animation. This new animation is constructed in real-time by the game engine rather than being stored in a separate file. Parametric animations can reduce artist workload during game development and provide a smoother appearance.

This technique was first used in an early version of the game Team Fortress 2.

== Motivation ==
In game development, animators are required to create unique animations to reflect actions performed by the player, e.g. shooting, reloading, and jumping. If the player were to jump while shooting, the artist would have two choices:

- Allow the game to display the animation with higher priority — in this case, shooting
- Create a separate animation depicting simultaneous jumping and shooting

To handle all such cases, the animator would need to create composite animations for every combination of actions; running while shooting, strafing while shooting, jumping while reloading, etc. With parametric animation, an animator only needs to create a few base animations from which the composite animations can be automatically constructed.

== Mechanism ==
Animations have layer and priority data that can be combined and overridden. For example, a shooting animation might override the character's torso to point the gun forward but defer lower body movement to the active run, jump, or strafe animation.
