= Perspectives in Public Health =

- Discipline: Public Health
- Language: English
- Edited by: Joanna Saunders, Theo Stickley

Publication details
- Former name: Former titles (until 2009): Royal Society for the Promotion of Health. Journal (United Kingdom) (1466-4240) Which incorporated (1999-2003): Hygeia (United Kingdom) (1740-4819) (until 1998): Royal Society of Health. Journal (United Kingdom) (0264-0325) (until 1983): Royal Society of Health. Journal (United Kingdom) (0035-9130) (until 1960): Royal Society for the Promotion of Health. Journal (United Kingdom) (0370-7318) (1894-1955): Royal Sanitary Institute. Journal (United Kingdom) (0370-7334)
- History: 1879-present
- Publisher: SAGE Publications
- Frequency: Bimonthly
- Impact factor: 5.8 (2022)

Standard abbreviations
- ISO 4: Perspect. Public Health

Indexing
- ISSN: 1757-9139 (print); 1757-9147 (web)
- LCCN: 2009245000
- OCLC no.: 525941732

Links
- Journal homepage; Online access; Online archive

Perspectives in Public Health is a bimonthly peer-reviewed medical journal that covers the field of public health. It is practice oriented and is published on behalf of the Royal Society for Public Health by SAGE Publications.

== History ==
The journal has been published under its current name since 2008, when the Royal Society for Public Health was formed. It was originally established in 1879 under the title The Journal of the Royal Society for the Promotion of Health, on behalf of The Royal Society of Health, also known as the Royal Society for the Promotion of Health. This organisation merged with the Royal Institute of Public Health in 2008, forming the Royal Society for Public Health, and consequently the journal was renamed. The full archive of the journal, dating back to 1879, is available to view online.

== Abstracting and indexing ==
The journal is abstracted and indexed in Scopus and the Social Sciences Citation Index. According to the Journal Citation Reports, its 2022 impact factor is 5.8.
