= Microinsurance =

Protection of low-income people

Microinsurance is the protection of low-income people (defined as those living on more than approximately $1 but less than $4 per day) against specific perils in exchange for regular premium payment proportionate to the likelihood and cost of the risks involved. This definition is exactly the same as one might use for regular insurance except for the clearly prescribed target market: low-income people. The target population typically consists of persons ignored by mainstream commercial and social insurance schemes, as well as persons who have not previously had access to appropriate insurance products.

The institutions or set of institutions implementing microinsurance are commonly referred to as a microinsurance scheme.

== Definitions ==
1. Microinsurance is insurance with low premiums and low caps / coverage. In this definition, "micro" refers to the small financial transaction that each insurance policy generates. "General micro insurance product means health insurance contract, any contract covering the belongings, such as, hut, livestock or tools or instruments or any personal accident contract, either on individual or group basis, as per terms stated in Schedule-I appended to these regulations"; and "life microinsurance product" means any term insurance contract with or without return of premium, any endowment insurance contract or health insurance contract, with or without an accident benefit rider, either on individual or group basis, as per terms stated in Schedule-II appended to these regulations as those within defined (low) minimum and maximum caps. The Indian Insurance Regulatory and Development Authority (IRDAI) characterizes microinsurance by the product features. This is further complemented by their definition for microinsurance agents, those appointed by and acting for an insurer, for distribution of microinsurance products (and only those products).
2. Microinsurance is a financial arrangement to protect low-income people against specific perils in exchange for regular premium payments proportionate to the likelihood and cost of the risk involved. The author of this definition adds that micro-insurance does not refer to: (i) the size of the risk-carrier (some are small and even informal, others very large companies); (ii) the scope of the risk (the risks themselves are by no means "micro" to the households that experience them); (iii) the delivery channel: it can be delivered through a variety of different channels, including small community-based schemes, credit unions or other types of microfinance institutions, but also by enormous multinational insurance companies, etc.
3. Microinsurance is synonymous to community-based financing arrangements, including community health funds, mutual health organizations, rural health insurance, revolving drugs funds, and community involvement in user-fee management. Most community financing schemes have evolved in the context of severe economic constraints, political instability, and lack of good governance. The common feature within all, is the active involvement of the community in revenue collection, pooling, resource allocation and, frequently, service provision.
4. Microinsurance is the use of insurance as an economic instrument at the "micro" (i.e. smaller than national) level of society. This definition integrates the above approaches into one comprehensive conceptual framework. It was first published in 1999, pre-dating the other three approaches, and has been noted to be the first recorded use of the term "microinsurance". Under this definition, decisions in microinsurance are made within each unit, (rather than far away, at the level of governments, companies, NGOs that offer support in operations, etc.).

Insurance functions on the concept of risk pooling, and likewise, regardless of its small unit size and its activities at the level of single communities, so does microinsurance. Microinsurance links multiple small units into larger structures, creating networks that enhance both insurance functions (through broader risk pools) and support structures for improved governance (i.e. training, data banks, research facilities, access to reinsurance etc.). This mechanism is conceived as an autonomous enterprise, independent of permanent external financial lifelines, and its main objective is to pool both risks and resources of whole groups for the purpose of providing financial protection to all members against the financial consequences of mutually determined risks.

The last definition therefore, includes the critical features of the previous three:

1. transactions are low-cost (and reflect members’ willingness to pay);
2. clients are essentially low-net-worth (but not necessarily uniformly poor);
3. the essential role of the network of microinsurance units is to enhance risk management of the members of the entire pool of microinsurance units over and above what each can do when operating as a stand-alone entity.

== Products ==
Microinsurance, like regular insurance, may be offered for a wide variety of risks. These include both health risks (illness, injury, or death) and property risks (damage or loss). A wide variety of microinsurance products exist to address these risks, including crop insurance and livestock/cattle insurance, which are increasingly sold as index-based insurance, theft or fire insurance, health insurance, term life insurance, death insurance, disability insurance, and insurance for natural disasters.

Microinsurance has made a significant difference in countries like Mali, as Maxime Prud'Homme and Bakary Traoré describe in Innovations in Sikasso. Still, many countries face continuing challenges. Specifically in Bangladesh, micro health insurance schemes are having trouble with financial and institutional sustainability, Syed Abdul Hamid and Jinnat Ara describe, but things are improving.

== Delivery models ==
One of the greatest challenge for microinsurance is the actual delivery to clients. Methods and models for doing so vary depending on the organization, institution, and provider involved. As Dubby Mahalanobis states, one must be thorough and careful when making policies, otherwise microinsurance could do more harm than good. In general, there are four main methods for offering microinsurance the partner-agent model, the provider-driven model, the full-service model, and the community-based model. Each of these models has their own advantages and disadvantages.

- Partner agent model: A partnership is formed between the micro insurance(partner as MFI) scheme and an agent (insurance companies), and in some cases a third-party healthcare provider. The microinsurance scheme is responsible for the delivery and marketing of products to the clients, while the agent retains all responsibility for design and development. In this model, microinsurance schemes benefit from limited risk, but are also disadvantaged in their limited control. Micro Insurance Centre is an example of an organization using this model.
- Full service model: The microinsurance scheme is in charge of everything; both the design and delivery of products to the clients, working with external healthcare providers to provide the services. This model has the advantage of offering microinsurance schemes full control, yet the disadvantage of higher risks.
- Provider-driven model: The healthcare provider is the microinsurance scheme, and similar to the full-service model, is responsible for all operations, delivery, design, and service. There is an advantage once more in the amount of control retained, yet disadvantage in the limitations on products and services.
- Community-based/mutual model: The policyholders or clients are in charge, managing and owning the operations, and working with external healthcare providers to offer services. This model is advantageous for its ability to design and market products more easily and effectively, yet is disadvantaged by its small size and scope of operations.

== Microinsurance scheme ==
A microinsurance scheme is a scheme that uses, among others, an insurance mechanism whose beneficiaries are (at least in part) people excluded from formal social protection schemes, particularly, informal economy workers and their families. The scheme differs from others created to provide legal social protection to formal economy workers. Membership is not compulsory (but can be automatic), and members pay, at least in part, the necessary contributions in order to cover benefits.

The expression "microinsurance scheme" designates either the institution that provides insurance (e.g., a health mutual benefit association) or the set of institutions (in the case of linkages) that provide insurance or the insurance service itself provided by an institution that also handles other activities (e.g., a micro-finance institution).

The use of the mechanism of insurance implies:

- Prepayment and resource-pooling: the regular prepayment of contributions (before the insured risks occur) that are pooled together.
- Risk-sharing: the pooled contributions are used to pay a financial compensation to those who are affected by predetermined risks, and those who are not exposed to these risks do not get their contributions back.
- Guarantee of coverage: a financial compensation for a number of risks, in line with a pre-defined benefits package.

Microinsurance schemes may cover various risks (health, life, etc.); the most frequent microinsurance products are:

- Life microinsurance (and retirement savings plans)
- Health microinsurance (hospitalisation, primary health care, maternity, etc.)
- Disability microinsurance
- Property microinsurance – assets, livestock, housing
- Crop microinsurance

Dirk Reinhard provides a good list summarising reading pertinent to microinsurance. Small means, massive impact

== Economic development ==
Microinsurance is recognized as a useful tool in economic development. As many low-income people do not have access to adequate risk-management tools, they are vulnerable to fall back into poverty in times of hardship, for example when the breadwinner of the family dies, or when high hospital bills force families to take out loans with high interest rates. Furthermore, microinsurance makes it possible for people to take more risks. When farmers are insured against a bad harvest (resulting from drought), they are in a better position to grow crops which give high yields in good years, and bad yields in year of drought. Without the insurance, however, they will be inclined to do the opposite; since they have to safeguard a minimal level of income for themselves and their families, crops will be grown which are more drought resistant, but which have a much lower yield in good weather conditions.

== See also ==
- Friendly society
- Health economics
- Insurance in India
- Microfinance
