= Caribbean Catastrophe Risk Insurance Facility Segregated Portfolio Company =

- Formerly: Caribbean Catastrophe Risk Insurance Facility
- Type: Segregated Portfolio Company
- Industry: insurance
- Founded: June 1, 2007; 19 years ago in Cayman Islands
- Headquarters: c/o Sagicor Insurance Managers; Harbour Place, 1st Floor; 103 South Church Street; PO Box 1087; KY1-1102, Grand Cayman, Cayman Islands
- Area served: Caribbean and Central America
- Key people: Timothy Antoine, Chairman of the Board; Isaac Anthony, Chief Executive Officer
- Products: Parametric insurance for Tropical cyclone, Earthquake, Excess rainfall, Fisheries, and Electric utilities
- Website: www.ccrif.org

Caribbean Catastrophe Risk Insurance Facility Segregated Portfolio Company (CCRIF SPC) is an insurance company headquartered in the Cayman Islands. The sixteen original member-countries of CCRIF included participants in CARICOM, and the membership of the Board of Directors is selected by CARICOM and by the Caribbean Development Bank.

Founded in 2007, CCRIF is the first multi-country risk pool in the world, and was the first insurance instrument to successfully develop parametric policies backed by both traditional and capital markets. These parametric policies release funds based upon factors of a calamity such as rainfall or wind speed, which can speed up the payout of policies rather than after damages are assessed. Unused funds are kept as reserves for the CCRIF. The fund can also draw upon $140 million in funds underwritten by reinsurance.

Other regions have since setup similar government disaster instance including in the African Union and the Pacific Islands Forum.

== History ==
From 2004 through 2007, planning to create the Caribbean Regional Risk Insurance Facility, or CCRIF, was performed under the technical leadership of the World Bank with a grant from the Government of Japan. In 2007, CCRIF offered its first parametric insurance products, earthquake and tropical cyclone.

In 2007, CCRIF made its first payout to the governments of St Lucia and Dominica for the earthquake on November 29, and in 2008, CCRIF made its first payout to the government of the Turks and Caicos Islands in response to damage from Hurricane Ike.

During its early years of operation, day-to-day operations of CCRIF were handled by Caribbean Risk Managers Limited (CaribRM), who acted as the facility supervisor. In 2013, Isaac Anthony, previously a member of the Board of Directors of CCRIF and the Permanent Secretary for Planning and National Development in the Government of St Lucia, was appointed the first Chief Executive Officer.

In 2014, CCRIF reorganized into a segregated portfolio company, or SPC. CCRIF SPC began to offer its portfolio of insurance products to countries in Central America, including members of the Council of Ministers of Finance of Central America, Panama and the Dominican Republic (COSEFIN). And in 2014, CCRIF SPC also was the first company to participate in the World Bank Capital-at-Risk Notes Program to diversify its sources of risk capital.

At the G7 leaders summit in 2015, CCRIF SPC was highlighted as an example to be used, "... to increase by up to 400 million the number of people in the most vulnerable developing countries who have access to direct or indirect insurance coverage against the negative impact of climate change related hazards by 2020..." At the 2015 United Nations Climate Change Conference in Paris, Ban Ki-moon, Secretary General of the United Nations, mentioned CCRIF SPC as an example as he launched an initiative on climate resilience that included increased access to insurance, and President Obama announced a commitment of $30 million by the United States government to provide additional insurance through platforms, including CCRIF, in his remarks to the Alliance of Small Island States at the Paris Conference.

In 2016, the World Bank announced the Pandemic Emergency Facility built using CCRIF SPC as a model.

== Parametric Insurance Products ==
=== Earthquake ===
Updated in 2019 to use the SPHERA model (System for Probabilistic Hazard Evaluation and Risk Assessment), the CCRIF earthquake insurance product is built from a number of components including the exposure module, hazard module, vulnerability module, and loss module. All of these components contribute to the insurance module, which is used to calculate the premium, the conditions under which a country's policy is triggered, and the amount of payout in the event of trigger.

=== Tropical cyclone ===
Updated in 2019 to use the SPHERA model (System for Probabilistic Hazard Evaluation and Risk Assessment), the CCRIF tropical cyclone insurance product is based on a probabilistic assessment of the risk of events and induced losses including near real-time estimates of damages to infrastructure due to windspeed and storm surge. A combination of exposure, hazard, vulnerability, and loss modules are used to creates the final insurance policy including attachment and exhaustion points used for pricing and payouts.

=== Excess rainfall ===
In 2014, CCRIF expanded its product line to include parametric insurance for excess rainfall.

=== Fisheries Sector (COAST) ===
In 2016, the World Bank announced a partnership with CCRIF SPC to create a new insurance product to protect food security and promote the resilience of the small-scale fisheries sector in the Caribbean. In 2019, CCRIF SPC offered the Caribbean Ocean and Aquaculture Sustainability faciliTy (COAST) insurance product as a pilot in the countries of St Lucia and Grenada. The COAST product was renewed in 2020 and again in 2021. During the 2021 United Nations Climate Change Conference, the Republic of Ireland announced a gift of one million euros to support the expansion of COAST to additional countries. COAST has been studied as an instrument of science diplomacy promoting finance for development to support climate resilience by linking adaptive social safety nets for individuals, community-level weather risks, and a sovereign financial instrument. The first triggered payment of COAST was more than $1 million to Grenada following Hurricane Beryl in 2024.

=== Electric utilities sector ===
In 2020, CCRIF SPC announced the offering of a new parametric product for electric utilities. This is the first parametric product by CCRIF SPC to target private firms.

== See also ==
- Caribbean Disaster Emergency Management Agency (CDEMA)
