= Parametric insurance =

Insurance that agrees to pay out upon a triggering event

Parametric insurance (also called index-based insurance) is a non-traditional insurance product that offers pre-specified payouts based upon a trigger event. Trigger events depend on the nature of the parametric policy and can include environmental triggers such as wind speed and rainfall measurements, business-related triggers such as foot traffic, and more. Examples of current parametric products include the Caribbean Catastrophe Risk Insurance Facility (CCRIF), the African Risk Capacity (ARC), and the protection of coral reefs in the state of Quintana Roo in Mexico.

Parametric insurance policies have most frequently been implemented in developing economies, oftentimes for agriculture insurance. In the US, there are proposals to implement parametric policies more often, specifically in the case of flood insurance through the National Flood Insurance Program.

== Comparison to traditional indemnity insurance ==
Traditional indemnity insurance is structured so that after an event that leads to a loss, such as a fire, flood, storm, or car accident, the insurer reimburses the insured for the total value of the loss, subject to any limits and deductibles are included in the insurance policy. To quantify loss, a representative from the insurance company assesses the damage. In a parametric insurance policy, insurance companies need to verify that the loss event exceeded the trigger event(s) specified in the policy. For weather-based parameters, this involves researching measurements from trusted third-party weather services or collecting sensor and satellite data to verify the magnitude of the weather event. Once the magnitude of the trigger is verified and "proof-of-loss" is obtained, the insurer disseminates the payout specified in the policy for the corresponding trigger event(s) to the insured.

The main benefit of parametric insurance policies is that they offer faster payouts than traditional insurance based on the nature of the trigger event. Because it is quick to verify if the trigger event passed the threshold specified in the policy, parametric policies can payout quickly. These quick payouts are especially beneficial for the liquidity to successfully recover after a disaster strikes. In addition, parametric insurance is suited for hard-to-model, low-frequency but high-intensity losses as in catastrophic perils, weather-related risks in agriculture or other economic activities, and risks sought to be covered without sufficient history of losses captured as insurance-readable data. Finally, parametric insurance may reduce transaction costs involved in writing and administering insurance policies because there is less need for actual loss assessment for payment of claims or underwriting rating requirements to determine the premium based on liabilities and extent of risk sharing.

The main drawback of parametric insurance policies is that they often do not cover the full basis risk of the insured. Policies are based on parameters and, therefore, do not always cover the full damage that occurs.

== Examples ==
=== Coral Reefs in Quintana Roo, Mexico ===
Part of the Mesoamerican Reef (MAR) is located off the coast of the state of Quintana Roo in Mexico, where Cancún is located. The reef has experienced degradation from pollution, storm damage, rising ocean temperatures, and increasing tourist activities. Recent analysis indicated that the reef prevents $42 million in damage to buildings and $20.8 million in damage to hotels annually. In response, Quintana Roo created the Coastal Management Trust Fund to purchase a parametric insurance policy for protecting and restoring the reef. The parametric policy has an annual maximum payout of $3.8 million and is triggered by wind speed. The payout changes based on the wind speed in the manner below:

- 100-129 knots → 40% of maximum parametric payout
- 130-159 knots → 80% of maximum parametric payout
- > 160 knots → 100% of maximum parametric payout

Partners of the Quintana Roo government include the Nature Conservancy, the Cancún and Puerto Morelos Hotel Owners' Association, CONANP, Mexican Universities and insurance industry representatives.

The insurance policy was triggered during Hurricane Delta in October 2020, for which the Coastal Management Trust Fund received $850,000.

=== Caribbean Catastrophe Risk Insurance Facility (CCRIF) ===
CCRIF is an insurance company established in 2007 that allows Caribbean and Central American countries to purchase parametric insurance products for weather catastrophes. By pooling their risks together, each participating country is able to purchase insurance for significantly less than if they had gone through the private market.

=== Pacific Catastrophe Risk Insurance Company (PCRIC) ===
In the aftermath of Cyclone Harold (2020), the government of Tonga received a US$4.5 million payout from the Pacific Catastrophe Risk Insurance Company (PCRIC) based on its insurance cover against tropical cyclones, the largest payment in the company's history. These funds provided the government with much needed rapid-response financing to support disaster-relief efforts at a crucial time with Governments around the world also grappling with the impacts of COVID-19.

Tonga is one of the Pacific Island countries that purchased catastrophe risk insurance from PCRIC – a regional catastrophe insurance platform that offers governments insurance cover against climate and seismic hazards, currently tropical cyclones and earthquake/tsunamis. PCRIC policies are designed to payout quickly after a triggering event to provide immediate access to liquidity for disaster response. A representative of the Government of Tonga welcomed confirmation of the payment: "These funds will enhance our ability to respond to the needs of our communities impacted by Cyclone Harold and already dealing with the impacts of the COVID-19 global pandemic" said Balwyn Fa'otusia, CEO for the Tonga Ministry of Finance "in these challenging times the value of these products has been shown in supporting our wider strategy to financing natural disaster responses."

Cyclone Harold reached its peak intensity as a Category 5 cyclone as it tore a path across the Solomon Islands, Vanuatu, Fiji and Tonga, causing widespread destruction across the region. The cyclone passed within 100km of Tongatapu, Tonga's main island, with significant storm surge coinciding with king tides, which caused wide spread damage around the coastline.

=== Northern Territory, Australia Parametric Cyclone Cover ===
in November 2021, Lloyd's backed Redicova implemented a parametric cover that utilises a payout per unit of cover with discreet units redeemable for $1,000 in the event of a loss. If a property is directly in the path of a cyclone, the payout is $1,000, while an affected property within a 5km buffer zone would see a payout of $300 per unit purchased. This allows rapid payout with no assessment of loss.

=== Parametric hail cover for dealerships in Australia ===
As climate change affects weather events in Australia, traditional indemnity-based policies are becoming more exposed to uncertainty. This uncertainty is being reflected in increased premiums and reduced cover for commercial entities across Australia. Parametric hail covers, such as the Hail Cover for Dealerships offered by Mainstay Underwriting, is offering the policyholder and the insurer less uncertainty, resulting in more affordable premiums. It's impossible to know the value of a disaster before it happens, so by setting a claim value for a defined event, such as hailstone sizes, the insurer has more certainty of costs and can offer lower premiums.
