= Engineers Without Borders International =

Organization

Engineers Without Borders International (EWB-I) is an association of individual Engineers Without Borders/Ingénieurs sans frontières groups. EWB-I facilitates collaboration and the exchange of information among the member groups. EWB-I helps its member groups develop their capacity to assist underserved communities in their respective countries and around the world.

== Organizational structure ==
EWB-I is a virtual organization with staff located in both the United States and South Africa. EWB-I is run by an international board, composed of representatives of the EWB/ISF groups.

The member groups of EWB-I support the association's vision for "A sustainable world where engineering enables long-term positive social and global development for the benefit of people and the environment everywhere." EWB-I seeks to promote collaboration and fulfill its mission "To be the beating heart of the engineering movement for sustainable global development, building and evolving engineering capacity throughout the world.

== Projects ==
Projects conducted by individual EWB/ISF member groups are grassroots and small and are not usually addressed by in-country consulting firms. Through their work and projects, EWB-I member groups contribute to meeting the UN Millennium Development Goals (MDGs) and Sustainable Development Goals (SDGs) through capacity building in their projects. EWB-I also endorses the Earth Charter and the Universal Declaration of Human Rights.

== International coordination ==
While each member group is fully independent and autonomous, EWB-I provides a platform for its member groups, affiliates, and outside organizations

- Contribute to meeting the MDGs and SDGs through capacity building in local projects
- Collaborate on projects and studies worldwide
- Share ideas, experiences, technical knowledge, and documentation
- Develop partnerships on community projects
- Address more global issues and projects
- Coordinate student exchanges, internships, and professional volunteers
- Advertise meetings and events
- Train and connect engineering professionals and students around the world
- Create synergy between their members

EWB-International also facilitates the start-up of new groups in the areas where none currently exist. EWB-I consists of member groups, provisional member groups, and start-up groups. Membership requires that all member groups adhere to high professional and ethical standards as stated in the EWB-I Bylaws.

== Selected EWB-I member organizations ==
- Ingenieria Sin Fronteras (Argentina)
- Engineers Without Borders (Australia)
- Engineers Without Borders (Bangladesh)
- Ingénieurs Sans Frontières (Belgium)
- Ingenieurs zonder Grenzen (Belgium)
- Engineers Without Borders (Bolivia)
- Engenheiros Sem Fronteiras (Brazil) Archived 2018-08-29 at the Wayback Machine
- Engineers Without Borders (Burundi)
- Engineers Without Borders (Cambodia)
- Ingénieurs Sans Frontières (Cameroon)
- Engineers Without Borders (Canada)
- Ingeniería Sin Fronteras (Chile)
- Engineers Without Borders (Colombia)
- Engineers Without Borders (Congo-DRC)
- Engineers Without Borders (Côte d'Ivoire)
- Engineers Without Borders (Denmark)
- Engineers Without Borders (Ecuador)
- Engineers Without Borders (Egypt)
- Engineers Without Borders (Finland)
- Engineers Without Borders (Gabon)
- Ingenieurs zonder Grenzen (Germany)
- Engineers Without Borders (Ghana)
- Engineers Without Borders (Greece)
- Engineers Without Borders (Honduras)
- Engineers Without Borders (Hong Kong)
- Engineers Without Borders (India)
- Engineers Without Borders (Iran)
- Engineers Without Borders (Iraq)
- Engineers Without Borders (Israel)
- Engineers Without Borders (Jordan)
- Engineers Without Borders (Kenya)
- Engineers Without Borders (Korea)
- Engineers Without Borders (Kosovo)
- Engineers Without Borders (Kuwait)
- Engineers Without Borders (Lebanon)
- Inzeneri bez Granici (Macedonia)
- Engineers Without Borders (Malawi)
- Engineers Without Borders (Malaysia)
- Ingenieros Sin Fronteras (Mexico)
- Engineers Without Borders (Nepal)
- Engineers Without Borders (Netherlands)
- Engineers Without Borders (New Zealand)
- Engineers Without Borders (Nigeria)
- Ingeniører uten grenser (Norway)
- Engineers Without Borders (Pakistan)
- Engineers Without Borders (Palestine)
- Engineers Without Borders (Panama)
- Engineers Without Borders (Peru)
- Engineers Without Borders (Portugal)
- Engineers Without Borders (Qatar)
- Engineers Without Borders (Rwanda)
- Engineers Without Borders (Sierra Leone)
- Engineers Without Borders (Singapore)
- Engineers Without Borders (South Africa)
- Engineers Without Borders (Sri Lanka)
- Engineers Without Borders (Sudan)
- Ingenjörer utan gränser (Sweden)
- Engineers Without Borders (Switzerland)
- Engineers Without Borders (Syria)
- Engineers Without Borders (Tanzania)
- Engineers Without Borders (Türkiye)
- Engineers Without Borders (UAE)
- Engineers Without Borders (Uganda)
- Engineers Without Borders (UK)
- Engineers Without Borders (USA)
- Engineers Without Borders (Venezuela)

Engineers Without Borders International is not in any way affiliated with Doctors Without Borders, which is a registered trademark of Bureau International de Medecins Sans Frontieres.

== See also ==
- Engineers Without Borders – includes information about similarly named organizations not affiliated with EWB-I
