= Engineers Without Borders (New Zealand) =

New Zealand non-governmental organization

EWBNZ
- Formation: 2008
- Website: www.ewb.org.nz
- Formerly called: PULSE, CREW

Engineers Without Borders New Zealand (EWBNZ) is a not-for-profit organisation based in New Zealand who champion humanitarian engineering as a means to improve community well-being, opportunity and alleviate poverty in all its forms. The organisation is member-based and incorporates several chapters of professional engineers, in Auckland, Hamilton, Wellington and Christchurch as well as two student chapters, from the University of Canterbury and the University of Auckland.

== History ==
The organisation was founded in early 2008 from the merging of several student groups based at the University of Auckland and the University of Canterbury with similar goals of community development. The foundations of EWBNZ were laid in 2006 when a group of eight engineering students called PULSE, led by student Holly Corbett and engineer Craig Omundsen, undertook a water scheme design for World Vision in Vanuatu. The PULSE group then completed an assessment programme of village-managed water schemes in Samoa in 2007. These trips inspired another group to form in 2007 called CREW led by student Haydn Luckman. Their work in Samoa included collaboration with the local community to install water tanks, and design and construct a new wharf. These two groups, based in Auckland, merged along with a group from the University of Canterbury, led by student Sofian Irsheid, to come under the name "Engineers Without Borders New Zealand" (EWBNZ). "Engineers Without Borders" is a well recognised name that has been adopted by similar organisations in Australia (Engineers Without Borders Australia), Canada (Engineers Without Borders Canada) and worldwide.

EWBNZ works to make a difference for communities within New Zealand and the South Pacific by:

1. Partnerships: Working in partnership with communities to address a lack of access to basic human needs such as clean water, sanitation and hygiene, energy, basic infrastructure, waste systems, information communication technology and engineering education.
2. Education: Educating and training New Zealand students, engineers and the wider community on issues including sustainable development, appropriate technology, poverty and the power of humanitarian engineering.
3. Network: Leading a movement of like-minded people with strong values and a passion for humanitarian engineering within New Zealand and overseas.

EWBNZ is an incorporated society and is a registered charitable trust.

== Chapters ==
Engineers Without Borders has a number of chapters throughout New Zealand.

Auckland University Chapter (EWBNZ Auckland)

The EWBNZ University of Auckland chapter works to achieve the EWB Mission with a combination of projects and awareness programmes. Since the beginning of 2008, they have engaged in projects in Tonga and Vanuatu.

University of Canterbury Chapter

The University of Canterbury chapter was established in 2008, and is based at the University of Canterbury in Christchurch.

Professional Chapter (EWBNZ Professionals)

The professional chapter was established in late 2008 with a core working group organising a committee and formulating the chapter goals. The chapter was formally launched on 11 March 2009. It is different from the university chapters in that its base is professionals (mainly practicing engineers), who range from graduates to chartered professional engineers with several years of experience. With this broad range of expertise the chapter is able to apply its members to a wide range of engineering work.

== EWB In-Schools ==
The EWB in-schools programme works to educate school students on issues facing humanity and also develop an interest in engineering and sustainable development. Volunteers partner with local schools and visit classrooms to run workshops with students.

== EWB Design Challenge ==
The EWB Design Challenge is a competition run annually at universities nationwide, including the University of Auckland, Auckland University of Technology, University of Canterbury and Massey University focusing on fostering an appreciation of real problems faced by communities by providing real-world situations. It is generally run as a part of a first year Engineering Design paper, and involves all first year students. Since 2009, it has been run in conjunction with EWB Australia's Design Challenge and has focused on communities within places such as the Mekong Delta in Vietnam (2013) and the Gorkha District in Nepal (2015).

== See also ==
- Engineers Without Borders
- Humanitarian engineering
- Transition engineering
- Sustainable engineering
