= Zonder =

Zonder may refer to:

- De Man Zonder Hart, 1937 Dutch drama film directed by Léo Joannon
- Ingenieurs zonder Grenzen, (Dutch for Engineers Without Borders), a name used by two Belgian organisations
- Zonder, the antagonist alien species from The King of Braves GaoGaiGar
- Mark Zonder (born 1958), the drummer of American heavy-metal band Warlord
- Orkest Zonder Naam (Nameless Orchestra) was the orchestra of the catholic broadcasting corporation KRO during the pillarization of Dutch society

== See also ==
- Zonda (disambiguation)
- Zander (disambiguation)
