= Engineers Without Borders (Canada) =

Canadian non-governmental organization

- Founded: 2000
- Founders: George Roter; Parker Mitchell
- Type: International development NGO
- Purpose: Domestic activities: Advocacy, public outreach, education Overseas development: Agriculture, water / sanitation, rural infrastructure
- Location: Toronto, Ontario, Canada
- Region served: Fundraising / outreach: Canada; Overseas development: Burkina Faso, Ghana, Malawi, Zambia
- Members: > 50,000
- Key people: Don Thurston (Chair); David Boroto (CEO)
- Employees: 15–20
- Volunteers: approximately 3,500 active volunteers
- Website: www.ewb.ca

Engineers Without Borders Canada (EWB; French: Ingénieurs sans frontières Canada, ISF) is a non-governmental organization devoted to international development. Founded in 2000 by George Roter and Parker Mitchell, engineering graduates from the University of Waterloo, it is a registered Canadian charity focused on finding solutions to extreme poverty, specifically in rural Africa. The group has chapters at universities across Canada, and regional chapters aimed at professionals in several major cities.

EWB Canada has no direct affiliations with similarly named organizations in the rest of the world, although it does collaborate with them from time to time.

== Operations ==
=== In Canada ===
Rally at Queen's University celebrating the launch of their chapter initiative in 2009

In Canada, EWB Canada engages in numerous educational and public outreach activities in Canada including educating high school students about international development issues via the School Outreach program, enhancing curricula at some universities by developing assignments or courses for engineering students, and informing the Canadian public on global development issues. EWB Canada also works in advocacy campaigns aimed convincing the Canadian government to change policies and laws concerning international development issues. This is done through letter writing and meeting with politicians, among other means. Unknown to many, EWB Canada played a large role in the Canadian Live 8 concert in 2005 and has won numerous awards both nationally and internationally.

EWB Canada is a young, rapidly growing student-driven organization based on university chapters across Canada, with a national office in Toronto to support the university chapters and to co-ordinate and train overseas volunteers. As of January 2009 there are 26 university chapters, 7 professional chapters and more than 35,000 members nationwide. Paid staff is kept to a minimum in the organization, in order to run the organization as efficiently as possible; all positions outside the national office are volunteer. The members are primarily engineering students, although a number of non-engineering students are active members and have volunteered overseas.

There is an annual EWB Canada national conference every year in late January which is currently the largest international development conference in Canada. Its location varies from year to year depending on the chapter hosting it.

To raise money, EWB Canada created the Run to End Poverty (R2EP) national movement in 2009. Since its inception, it has had more than 50 events, in 18 different cities, raising over $600,000. These events are organized entirely by their volunteer base, engaging close to a thousand runners each year from coast-to-coast. The goal of the initiative is to eliminate extreme poverty in sub-Saharan Africa.

EWB Canada incorporates principles of social and environmental justice into its engineering initiatives, emphasizing sustainable and equitable development.

The organization’s partnerships reflect Canada’s broader commitment to global justice and sustainability.

=== Overseas ===
EWB works overseas (primarily in sub-Saharan Africa) with local NGOs and, occasionally, government departments (for example, the Ghanaian Ministry of Food and Agriculture) to help increase access to technology at the local level. The focus is on access to technology largely through local capacity-building rather than on technologies themselves.

Chapters are able to send overseas volunteers for four month work terms through the Junior Fellowship in International Development Program. Short term volunteers, or Junior Fellows, are student members returning to their chapter following their time overseas. Four months is considered a short term placement and the greatest impact is the overseas volunteers' contributions upon their return to their chapter in Canada – they return with a wide range of experiences and lessons that can be passed on to other members and the public at large.

Long-term overseas volunteers go on placements lasting one to three years. These are often university graduates that were involved with an EWB Canada university chapter. Knowledge and experience in international development, leadership skills and open-mindedness are considered much more important than just technical skills. The goal of these placements is not to alleviate poverty alone, but also to build capacity among the local non-governmental organization partners and community at large. For this reason all overseas projects are done in collaboration with a local NGO partner who is encouraged to take ownership of various projects and ultimately have no continued need for EWB Canada's help and input.

== Partnerships ==
As discussed above, EWB Canada works with local NGOs and government departments in order to carry out its overseas work. It also partners with other NGOs from time to time on projects of mutual interest, including the Canadian iteration of the Make Poverty History campaign.

=== Relationships with other EWB organizations ===
EWB Canada is legally and structurally separate from all other "Engineers Without Borders" organizations, although it assisted in the launch of EWB UK (which uses EWB Canada's lightbulb logo), and has also maintained close relationships with EWB Australia, ISF Spain, ISF Italy, and Engineers for a Sustainable World in the U.S.

Like the other above-noted EWB/ISF groups, EWB Canada initially did not join the EWB International network, which was started by EWB-USA and includes a separate group in the province of Quebec, Ingénieurs sans frontières Québec. The Canadian organization said that while it did attend some of EWB-I's meetings and occasionally collaborated with its member groups, active participation in that network would be difficult since the EWB-I groups did not share a "common strategy and culture" with each other, let alone with EWB Canada. In particular, the Canadian group was a strong critic of EWB-USA's focus on short-term development projects run by each chapter, arguing that "locally driven, locally appropriate change is the only sustainable change that will reduce people’s vulnerabilities and thus, reduce the need for short term, humanitarian type projects."

However, by early 2014, EWB Canada (along with several of the other previously-unaffiliated groups) had become a member of EWB International.

== Governance ==
George Roter served as the chief executive officer of the organization from January 2011 to July 2014. Previously, Roter was co-CEO along with fellow co-founder Parker Mitchell. Boris Martin was CEO from August 2014 to June 2022. David Boroto became the CEO in March 2025.

=== Board of directors ===
EWB's board consists of the following directors, in a mixture of appointed and elected positions.

- Rebecca Kresta (chair)
- Manissa Patel - Director of Finance, Admin & Compliance at Convergence Blended Finance
- Miriam Hird-Younger – PhD student in Anthropology at the University of Toronto
- Morenike Olaosebikan - Pharmacist, artist, facilitator and retail pharmacy owner.
- Kaitlyn Gillelan – Global Development and Indigenous studies student at Queen’s University

=== Advisory board ===
In addition to its board of directors, EWB Canada has an advisory board consisting of:

- Zafer Achi – director, McKinsey & Company
- J. Edward Brockhouse – founder, Brockhouse and Cooper
- Robert Chambers – research associate, Institute of Development Studies, University of Sussex
- Dato' Ir. Lee Yee Cheong – past president, World Federation of Engineering Organizations
- Rupert Duchesne – president and CEO, Aeroplan
- Sakiko Fukuda-Parr – past director, Human Development Report, United Nations Development Programme
- David Johnston – former Governor General of Canada, former president of University of Waterloo
- Donald Johnston – secretary general, Organisation for Economic Co-operation and Development
- Vernon Lobo – managing director, Mosaic Venture Partners
- Maureen O’Neil – president, Canadian Health Services Research Foundation
- James Orbinski – past president, Médecins Sans Frontières
- Patrick Pichette – CFO, Google
- Betty Plewes – past CEO, Canadian Council for International Co-operation
- John Ralston Saul – essayist and novelist
- Scott Rutherford – management consultant, previously of McKinsey & Company
- Ian Smillie – international development consultant and author
- Frances Stewart – director of development studies, University of Oxford

== See also ==
- Engineers Without Borders
