= Industrial Green Chemistry World =

Industrial convention in Mumbai, India

Industrial Green Chemistry World (IGCW), previously known as Industrial Green Chemistry Workshop, is an industrial convention which focuses on expanding, implementing and commercializing green chemistry and green engineering based technologies and products in the chemical industry. The first event was held in Powai, Mumbai, in 2009. It is held biennially, and the recent series of their convention was held between 6-8 November, 2023

The event is mainly divided into four sub-events - the Symposium, the Expo, the Awards and the Seminars. The IGCW Symposium is a platform where expert speakers from the academia and the industry deliver presentations on green sustainable innovations and achievements. The Expo is a platform for organizations from the chemical and pharmaceutical industry to exhibit their latest green chemistry innovations. The IGCW award recognizes outstanding research and initiatives in green chemistry and engineering to promote innovation in cleaner, cheaper, smarter chemistry developments that have been or can be utilized by the industry to achieve pollution prevention goals.

== History ==
IGCW is a biennial event dedicated to the cause of implementing and commercializing green chemistry and engineering on a large scale. The event is organized by Green ChemisTree Foundation and previously in collaboration with Newreka Green Synth Technologies Pvt. Ltd. The first event, which was held in 2009, addressed the need of the Indian chemical industry's future direction with global trends in sustainability, besides exploring opportunities for leveraging industrial green chemistry models for business differentiation and competitiveness. Over 300 participants from the chemical industry; 65% from chemical companies, 15% from academic and research institutes, 13% students and 7% officials from governments, their associates and societal bodies made up the attendees at the event.

== Overview ==
Industrial Green Chemistry World (IGCW) has a special focus primarily over the four most chemistry-intensive sectors:

- Pharmaceuticals
- Agro-chemicals
- Dyes & Pigments
- Specialty, Fine and Performance Chemicals.
