= Humanitarian engineering =

Discipline of engineering addressing humanitarian needs

Humanitarian engineering is the application of engineering for humanitarian aid purposes. As a meta-discipline of engineering, humanitarian engineering combines multiple engineering disciplines in order to address many of the world's crises and humanitarian emergencies, especially to improve the well-being of marginalized populations.

== Definition ==
Encyclopædia Britannica defines humanitarian engineering as:

Humanitarian engineering, the application of engineering to improving the well-being of marginalized people and disadvantaged communities, usually in the developing world. Humanitarian engineering typically focuses on programs that are affordable, sustainable, and based on local resources. Projects are typically community-driven and cross-disciplinary, and they focus on finding simple solutions to basic needs (such as close access to clean water; adequate heat, shelter, and sanitation; and reliable pathways to markets).

== History ==
The phrase "humanitarian engineering" was in little use before the early 2000s. Usage of the phrase "humanitarian engineering" practically does not exist in any professional literature from the 1800s to the year 2000.

Ingénieurs sans frontières, more commonly referred to as Engineers Without Borders, was one of the first organizations founded solely for the purpose of humanitarian engineering. Founded in France in 1982, the organization soon spawned chapters across Europe throughout the 1990s, eventually making its way to North America in 2000 with the founding of EWB-Canada.

However, the concept of utilizing engineering as a mechanism of promoting societal welfare has existed since the early days of the discipline. It evolved out of the creation of an engineering code of ethics as well as the acceptance of engineering ethics as a whole. While, initially, the notion of ethics was associated with personal decision, over time, a general framework of what an engineer ought to do became established. The creation of organizations such as the National Society of Professional Engineers furthered this trend, as many such organizations began to adopt codes of ethics specifically meant to create an ethics framework for engineers. Within these codes of ethics, obligations that engineers have to society were explicitly stated including ideas like: "Engineers shall at all times strive to serve the public interest." This evolved into the creation of humanitarian engineering projects meant to promote societal welfare. As a result, in the early days of the discipline, humanitarian engineering was really only an application of engineering ethics as well as something that was just a part of individual engineering disciplines.

As a discipline of study, though, it was around 2003, when the Colorado School of Mines created the first humanitarian engineering minor, that humanitarian engineering truly gained more recognition. Over time, as more and more universities have created programs explicitly for humanitarian engineering, it has grown as a standalone discipline, rather than just an implicit part of general engineering discipline.

== Relationships with other disciplines ==
Most engineering disciplines have a code of ethics that encourage working to improve the general welfare. For example, the Institute of Civil Engineers actively encourages the utilization of civil engineering in humanitarian work, calling it the "highest calling" of the occupation. Active work in the field ranges from an understanding of safety in humanitarian projects, to case studies on road building, refugee camps, footbridges, disaster response, housing and environmental clean-up. Likewise, organizations for other disciplines such as chemical engineering, environmental engineering, mechanical engineering, and biomedical engineering also encourage applying their respective disciplines for humanitarian engineering. This is coupled with the fact that many organizations, especially universities, conduct humanitarian engineering products utilizing skills from specific disciplines.

== Notable projects ==
=== The Peru Project ===
The Peru Project originated at UC Berkeley's chapter of Engineers Without Borders, and its goal was to introduce safe water sources to communities affected by groundwater wells that contained high levels of arsenic. The engineers built rainwater catchment systems in schools which utilized roof gutters to collect rainwater, a flush system to filter debris from the gutters, and a tank to collect the water. The water is made drinkable through chlorine disinfection and is distributed to other locations through piping. This has provided the community with clean water that is safe for consumption and cooking. The second initiative saw the group partnering with local health ministries to formulate a comprehensive arsenic education program to teach the community about the dangers of consumption.

=== Hydropower Development in Pakistan ===
This project led by Oregon State University involves students and faculty helping Pakistan attempt to harvest their potential for hydropower generation. The group has produced open-source modeling tools that can generate climate data to analyze long-term trends.

=== The Nyamilu Community Water Project ===
The Nyamilu Community Water Project began in 2005 as an Engineers Without Borders project led by both Dartmouth College and Louisiana State University. Dartmouth engineers were tasked with locating an appropriate location for a well, securing a permit for drilling, building the well, and installing a solar-powered water pump; Louisiana State University students would be in charge of building a water distribution system. After overcoming various setbacks, the engineers managed to complete the project with assistance from the village residents. The result of this project was a 30,000-liter tank and 6,000 meters of pipe that helped distribute this water within a two-kilometer radius.

=== Global Research on WaSH to Eliminate childhood Stunting (GRoWES) ===
The Global Research on WaSH (water, sanitation, and hygiene) to Eliminate childhood Stunting (GRoWES) project led by Daniel Oerther is an example of convergence research with diverse environmental health professionals – including engineers, nurses, and sanitarians – working together with communities to solve a complex societal challenge – namely, children growing up to be significantly short of stature (also known as stunted). The GRoWES project developed a novel approach leveraging community-based participatory research, mixed-methods, and interprofessional education to address the interface of providing access to drinking water and assuring food security. The GRoWES project has completed projects in rural villages in Guatemala, rural villages in Brazil, and informal settlements in South Africa.

== Training and education ==
An education in humanitarian engineering incorporates history, politics, economics, sociology, language, as well as rigorous engineering basics. Several universities in the United States focus efforts on Humanitarian Engineering:

Colorado School of Mines was the first school in the U.S. to offer Humanitarian Engineering as a minor. The Colorado School of Mines' Humanitarian Engineering program currently offers minors in Engineering for Community Development and Leadership in Social Responsibility, and a master's degree in Humanitarian Engineering.

Ohio State University, which also offers a minor in the field, has many local and international service projects, courses, and research in Humanitarian Engineering. OSU has been engaged in humanitarian engineering since 1979, and has grown to fully involve students since 2004. Some of their student organizations include Engineers for Community Service (ECOS), who completed a project at an orphanage in Montaña de Luz to help children affected by HIV/AIDS. In 2012, the Humanitarian Engineering Scholars (HES) program was formed, followed by a general Humanitarian Engineering course, and a Humanitarian Engineering Minor in 2014.

The University of Texas at Austin Cockrell School of Engineering began a humanitarian engineering program in 2010 with a field program called Projects for Underserved Communities. The program expanded to include a yearlong Humanitarian Product Development program and study abroad programs. An 18-credit hour Humanitarian Engineering Certificate is available for undergraduate students.

Oregon State University offers an undergraduate minor based on a set of Humanitarian Engineering, Science and Technology (HEST) courses including an international field course, as well as undergraduate and graduate research, capstone design projects with international partners, and a graduate fellowship program. The department has also planned and led projects in places such as Uganda, Guatemala, and Pakistan.

Drexel University offers a master's degree in Peace Engineering following some of the same humanitarian principles and includes a graduate level co-op where students can apply the concepts in the field in places such as refugee camps.

Villanova University has a program in Humanitarian Engineering with roots that go as far back as the early 1990s. The establishment of a program in Engineering Service-Learning which started in 2004 has since evolved into the Center for Humanitarian Engineering and International Development (C4HE) in 2019. The establishment of the C4HE has created a foundation for vertical and horizontal integration of international outreach where engineering students from all disciplines and all years, including graduate students, provide technical support to global non-profit organization via engineering design, capacity building, and research on sustainable development.[27][28]

UC Berkeley offers a Master's in Development Engineering, in a program with a focus on utilizing technology to make a positive societal impact. This degree is offered through the Blum Center for Developing Economies, and features faculty from six different colleges at the school. The program includes research and service learning projects designed to support communities at domestically and abroad.

Other schools such as Arizona State University, Purdue University, Penn State University, Dartmouth College, and many others have begun to offer majors, minors, and graduate programs in Humanitarian Engineering.

== Prominent organizations ==
=== Engineers Without Borders ===
EWB is an umbrella organization with chapters in multiple universities and organizations across the globe. EWB chapters founded across the globe operate as separate entities, but some are jointly coordinated through EWB-International. Its focus is on creating engineering projects that help marginalized communities across the globe. These projects are conducted by chapter organizations and emphasize education and sustainability. It also has a secondary focus on utilizing like-minded organizations to cut across borders and create change. Engineers Without Borders chapters are frequently found in universities, and utilize the mission of humanitarian engineering as a vector for hands on service learning.

=== Engineers Against Poverty ===
EAP is an organization that focuses on creating independent projects that focus on helping marginalized communities. These independent projects are then collaborated on with strategic partners. Projects mainly focus on education, infrastructure, and oil and gas.

=== RedR ===
Formerly called "Register of Engineers for Disaster Relief," this organization is an international NGO that works to support organizations and individuals that are addressing humanitarian emergencies, offer opportunities for people to participate in this work both directly and indirectly, and support any initiatives that fall within the field of humanitarian engineering. REDR primarily focuses on training relief organizations to help communities hurt by recent disasters.

=== Engineers for a Sustainable World ===
ESW is a nonprofit network that attempts to solve key sustainability problems through projects. It is an umbrella organization with chapters in over 50 universities.

=== Engineering for Change ===
E4C is an online, international community of engineers that collaborate to fix global problems in the status quo. Many of the members collaborate online to create solutions to these problems. There is also an emphasis on education with its website providing information on how to design solutions.

=== Peace Corps ===
The U.S. Peace Corps is an international development agency based within the U.S. They feature campaigns for improving WASH infrastructure in communities around the world, and frequently employ engineers to carry out these initiatives. The Peace Corps has currently retired most of its main engineering programs.

=== Community Engineering Corps ===
Referred to in short as the CECorps, this organization was formed as a partnership between the American Society of Civil Engineers (ASCE), the American Water Works Association (AWWA), and Engineers Without Borders USA (EWB-USA). This organization focuses on Pro bono engineering consulting done domestically within the U.S. Projects focus on Water, Wastewater, Civil Works, and Energy, and the services involved can range from procedural assistance, to full design and construction assistance.

== Journals ==
- International Journal for Service Learning in Engineering: Humanitarian Engineering and Social Entrepreneurship (IJSLE)
- Journal of Humanitarian Engineering - Engineers Without Borders Australia
- International Journal For Service Learning in Engineering

== Books ==
Humanitarian Engineering: Fundamentals, Exercises, and Applications

- Avendaño-Uribe, B. (2026). Humanitarian Engineering: Fundamentals, Exercises, and Application. University of Canterbury. https://doi.org/10.18124/8WTZ-ST45

== See also ==
- Engineering for Change
- Appropriate technology
- Humanitarian aid
- Grand Challenges
