= Bernard Amadei =

American civil engineering professor (born 1954)

- Born: July 23, 1954 (age 72); Roubaix, France
- Education: Ecole Nationale Supérieure de Géologie Appliquée, University of Toronto, University of California, Berkeley
- Known for: Founding Engineers Without Borders (USA); Engineers Without Borders-International Network; Mortenson Center in Engineering for Developing Communities
- Awards: Heinz Award in the Environment (2007); National Academy of Engineering; Hoover Medal (2007); ENR (2009) Award of Excellence (2009); Washington Award (2015); ASCE OPAL Award (2015); ASEE Hall of fame (2023); ACEC Award of Merit (2026); Seven Honorary Doctoral Degrees; Senior Ashoka Fellow
- Scientific career
- Fields: Development engineering; Systems engineering; Geological engineering; Engineering for peace and Diplomacy
- Workplaces: University of Colorado Boulder
- Website: www.colorado.edu/faculty/amadei

Bernard Amadei (born July 23, 1954) is a French-American engineer. He is a Distinguished Emeritus professor of civil engineering at the University of Colorado Boulder, founding president of Engineers Without Borders (USA), co-founder of the Engineers Without Borders-International Network, and founding director of the Mortenson Center in Engineering for Developing Communities (now Global Engineering). He is also a recipient of multiple awards and distinctions and holds seven honorary doctoral degrees. In 2012, Dr. Amadei was appointed as a Science Envoy to Pakistan and Nepal by the U.S. Department of State.

== Education ==
Amadei is a native of Roubaix, France, born on July 23, 1954. Amadei earned a Diploma of Engineer (Dipl. Eng.) in 1977 in the area of Applied Geology from the School of Applied Geology and Mining Engineering (Ecole Supérieure de Géologie Appliquée et de Prospection Minière) in Nancy, France (currently known as the École nationale supérieure de géologie or ENSG). Following a year of service in the French Army (August 1977 to August 1978), he began graduate studies abroad. He earned a Master of Applied Science from the University of Toronto in 1979 and was awarded a doctorate (PhD) in civil engineering in 1982 from the University of California, Berkeley for his thesis publication entitled "The Influence of Rock Anisotropy on Measurement of Stresses in Rock in situ." The Obama administration, following up the president's announcement of the program in Cairo, named Dr. Amadei one of three Scientific Envoys appointed by Secretary of State Clinton in November, 2012.

== Academic and Research Career ==
Amadei’s academic work shifted from geological engineering toward interdisciplinary approaches linking engineering with social issues, sustainable community development. At the University of Colorado Boulder, he contributed to the development of programs in development engineering, engineering for developing communities, and systems engineering.

His later research focuses on systems-based approaches to sustainable development and nexus challenges. He has worked on the use of system dynamics tools, combined with other decision-making methods, to model interactions among social, natural, economic, and infrastructure systems.

Amadei has argued for a broader role of engineering in addressing global poverty and improving living conditions. He has emphasized the need for engineering education and practice to incorporate systems thinking, reflective and adaptive approaches, stakeholder engagement, and field experience.

At the University of Colorado Boulder, Amadei has taught a variety of courses since 1982: Statics, Dynamics, Engineering Geology, Mechanics of Materials, Geological Engineering, Introduction to Design, Sustainability in the Built Environment, A Systems Approach to Global Engineering, and Sustainable Community Development.

== Establishment of Engineers Without Borders-USA ==
Engineers Without Borders-USA (EWB-USA) traces its origins to a 2000 trip to Belize by Bernard Amadei, a professor at the University of Colorado Boulder. The trip came about through a chance encounter with Angel T., a Belizean landscaper working in Colorado, who invited Amadei to visit rural Mayan communities. During his visit, Amadei was struck by conditions in the village of San Pablo, where residents many migrant farmers from Honduras living on less than a dollar a day relied on river water carried up steep, treacherous paths, a task that fell largely to young girls and limited their access to education.

Returning to Boulder, Amadei shared the experience with his students. From September 2000 to May 2001, a team of about ten undergraduates designed and built a hydraulic ram pump for San Pablo. The device, which uses only the energy of falling water and has a single moving part, was well suited to the village's remote jungle location, lack of electricity, and limited resources. After a prototype was tested in Boulder Creek, the system was installed in Belize in May 2001 and raised water about 120 feet (36 meters) without fuel or electricity. The project cost about $14,000 and faced many setbacks before it was completed in 2002 with a design that differed significantly from the original plan.

Energized by the experience, the students proposed forming a dedicated organization, which they named Engineers Without Borders. The group filed paperwork in 2001 to establish EWB-USA as a non-governmental organization. From its small student beginnings, EWB-USA grew to more than 10,000 members by 2025, completing over 1,100 projects that have affected more than five million people worldwide.

The initiative also led to the founding of the Engineering for Developing Communities program at CU Boulder in 2004, later renamed the Mortenson Center in Engineering for Developing Communities (now Global Engineering) in 2008.

== Awards and distinctions ==
- 1984 Rocha Medal from the International Society for Rock Mechanics - an award issued annually for an outstanding doctoral thesis in the field of rock mechanics.
- 2007 Hoover Medal.
- The 13th Annual Heinz Award in the Environment, 2007
- 2008, Elected member of the National Academy of Engineering (United States) for "the creation of Engineers Without Borders, leadership in sustainable development education, and research on geomechanics."
- 2009 Award of Excellence from Engineering News-Record for founding Engineers Without Borders (USA).
- 2009 Elected Distinguished Member of the American Society of Civil Engineers,
- 2013 Elected member of the National Academy of Construction (United States)
- 2011 Elected Senior Ashoka Fellow
- 2015 Washington Award, The Western Society of Engineers
- 2015 American Society of Civil Engineers, Outstanding Projects and Leaders (OPAL) (education)
- 2016 C. H. Dunn Award of the Construction Industry Institute
- 2016 Distinguished Professor, University of Colorado
- 2021 Maverick Influencer Award, BuiltWorlds
- 2023 ASEE Hall of Fame Inductee
- 2024 Honorary Member, American Academy of Environmental Engineers and Scientists.
- 2026 American Council of Engineering Companies (ACEC) Award of Merit
- Holds seven honorary doctoral degrees (UMass Lowell; Carroll College; Clarkson, Drexel, Worcester Polytechnic Institute, Technion (Israel), SUNY-ESF)

== List of works ==
- Amadei, Bernard (1983). Rock Anisotropy and the Theory of Stress Measurements. Springer-Verlag. ISBN 978-0-387-12388-2.
- Amadei, Bernard; Stephansson, Ove (2007). Rock Stress and its Measurement (1st ed.). Chapman & Hall. ISBN 978-0-412-44700-6.
- Amadei, Bernard (2014). Engineering in Sustainable Human Development. ASCE Press. ISBN 978-0-7844-1353-1.
- Amadei, Bernard (2015). A Systems Approach to Modeling Community Development Projects. Momentum Press. ISBN 978-1-60650-518-2.
- Amadei, Bernard (2019). A Systems Approach to Modeling the Water-Energy-Land-Food nexus Volume I. Momentum Press. ISBN 978-1-94708-352-3.
- Amadei, Bernard (2019). A Systems Approach to Modeling the Water-Energy-Land-Food nexus Volume II. Momentum Press. ISBN 978-1-94708-354-7.
- Amadei, Bernard (2023). Navigating the Complexity Across the Peace-Sustainability-Climate Security Nexus. CRC Press. ISBN 978-1-032-56338-1.
- Amadei, Bernard (2025). Engineering for Peace and Diplomacy. Jenny Stanford Publ. Amadei, Bernard (2025). Engineering for Peace and Diplomacy. CRC Press. ISBN 978-981-5129-75-5.
