= Malayalee Engineers Association in North America =

Malayalee Engineers Association in North America (MEANA) is a non-profit, non-political fellowship of Malayali (Malayalee) engineers in the United States. The primary objective is to provide a platform for sharing common interests of the engineers with Malayalee origin, find resolution for issues and contribute to the betterment of the society as a whole as well as address specific needs of home state Kerala, India. Current activities include Project-1000, a scholarship program to support Engineering Education in Kerala, Project Homeland, a program that has been initiated in 2007 to try and assist various initiatives in Kerala from an engineering standpoint. MEANA also honors outstanding contributions of Malayalee Engineers via its Engineer of the year award every year.

MEANA has its headquarters in Chicago, IL, United States and has started establishing chapters in various states in the USA starting in 2007. The Florida chapter was the first outside Chicago.

== Partners in various projects ==
- Engineering Colleges in Kerala
- Engineers Without Borders (USA)
