= Daniel A. Vallero =

American environmental author and scientist

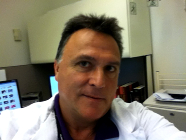
- Born: September 5, 1953 (age 73); East St. Louis, Illinois, United States
- Education: Southern Illinois University at Edwardsville (B.A.; MS in City & Regional Planning); University of Kansas (MS in Civil & Environmental Engineering); Duke University (Ph.D. in Civil & Environmental Engineering)
- Scientific career
- Fields: Biosystems engineering Environmental science Engineering ethics
- Workplaces: Duke University; U.S. Environmental Protection Agency; U.S. House of Representatives Staff

Daniel A. Vallero is an American environmental author and scientist. He was born in East St. Louis, Illinois and grew up in Collinsville, Illinois. He received a bachelor's degree and a master's degree in city and regional planning from Southern Illinois University-Edwardsville. He also earned a master's degree in civil and environmental engineering (environmental health sciences) from the University of Kansas and a PhD in civil and environmental engineering from Duke University with a thesis on "Dicarboximide Fungicide Flux to the Lower Troposphere from an Aquic Hapludult Soil".

== Career ==
Vallero is recognized internationally for advancing the state of environmental science and engineering, as an author, educator, engineer and scientific researcher. He has appeared on news and other shows, recently discussing plastic recycling on NBC's Today Show (http://www.today.com/video/today/51620316) and on MSNBC, and current state of ethics in research at universities. He began his professional career in the Kansas City regional office of the U.S. Environmental Protection Agency in 1976 and has worked in numerous other scientific venues since then. He directed the Science, Technology and Human Values Program at Duke University from 1997 to 2005. Beginning in 2005, he has been adjunct Professor of Engineering Ethics at Duke University, with a joint appointment in the Department of Civil and Environmental Engineering, and the Trinity School of Arts and Sciences. He held appointments also at the University of Missouri-Kansas City, North Carolina Central University, and as science staff member on Energy and Power Subcommittee of the United States House of Representatives.

In his books and other writings, Vallero has taken the systems view of science and engineering as they relate to life at every scale from molecular to planetary. As such he has bridged biomedical engineering with environmental engineering. He stresses the need to incorporate the social sciences into every engineering and design project. As a leader in engineering ethics, he has served the National Academy of Engineering as a member of the Online Ethics Committee and the Executive Board of the National Institute of Engineering Ethics. Vallero has also advised Sigma Xi, universities and other institutions on science and research ethics and the responsible conduct of research (RCR).

Vallero is editor for the Institution of Chemical Engineers' journal, Process Safety and Environmental Protection, as well as the MDPI journal, Sustainability. He is also the environmental engineering subject editor of the McGraw-Hill Encyclopedia of Science & Technology and the McGraw-Hill Yearbook of Science & Technology.

== Works ==
Vallero is a pioneer of green engineering and the application of life cycle analysis to engineering design. He was among the first to question the sustainability and ethics of using corn as a source of ethanol fuel. His reasoning was that current farming practice's dependence on fossil fuels needed to grow (including fertilizer and pesticides), harvest and ferment the corn is highly inefficient thermodynamically. The use of corn for fuel is especially problematic, since only the seed are used, not to mention the misuse of an important part of the global food supply. Vallero argued that other crops are much more sustainable, especially those that make use of the whole plant, including cellulosic material, like switchgrass (Panicum virgatum).

More recently, he has argued that a systematic approach and life cycle view be taken for climate-related actions, especially the need for scientifically credible risk assessments to inform the rapid expansion in the production of electric vehicles (EVs). As such, extraction and processing of rare earth elements and metals, especially copper, cobalt, and lithium will be met with large environmental risks that must be factored into large-scale decisions during the transition away from fossil fuels. For example, the environmental and social devastation that is presently occurring in the Republic of the Congo to extract cobalt must be part of any risk-benefit analysis, along with other environmental justice (EJ) and ethical factors. in addition, Vallero argues that there are major challenges ahead on the disposal and recycling of EV batteries, which calls for a sound application of Design for the Environment (DfE) methods, especially disassembly, decontamination, and reuse. Up to now, developing countries have received a disparate burden of the disposal of electronic waste (E-waste).

In the book, "DUST: The inside Story of its Role in the September 11th Aftermath," the late American scientist Paul Lioy credited Vallero with leading the way to sampling of hazardous air pollutants in and around Ground Zero following the 9/11 attacks on the World Trade Center. Lioy collaborated with Vallero in establishing a protocol for characterizing exposure in risk assessments following such emergencies. Lioy and Vallero coined the term “5 R’s” to delineate how exposure assessment varies during the five stages following a disaster: 1. Rescue; 2. Recovery; 3. Reentry; 4. Restoration; and 5. Rehabitation.

With architect, Chris Brasier, Vallero coined the term "synthovation," as a new design process for green engineering and green architecture. A combination of synthesis and innovation, sustainable design does not consider innovation to be an interruption (feedback loop) to the design process as in traditional "concept to completion" design. Rather, innovations are to be expected and integrated. Differing from the traditional step-wise process, synthovation is a spiral, dynamic, and continuously moving process toward completion of the design and throughout the life of the project, including end-of life recycling and design for disassembly, a component of design for environment (DfE), with innovations added along the way that will increase the sustainability of the project over its entire life cycle.

In her book, "Hormone Deception", Lindsey Berkson credits Vallero as among the first to apply exposure science to endocrine disruptors.

=== Books ===
- Vallero, D.A. (2025). Fundamentals of Air Pollution, 6th Edition. Academic Press, Amsterdam, Netherlands and Boston Massachusetts, ISBN 978-0-443-31446-9.1100 pages.
- Vallero, D. A. (2024). Fundamentals of Water Pollution: Quantifying Pollutant Formation, Transport, Transformation, Fate, and Risks, Academic Press, Amsterdam, Netherlands and Boston Massachusetts, ISBN 9780443289873 450 pages. doi:10.1016/C2023-0-50836-5.
- Vallero, D.A. (2023). Air Pollution Calculations, 2nd Edition. Academic Press, Amsterdam, Netherlands and Boston MA, ISBN 978-0-443-13987-1. 672 pages.
- Vallero, D.A. and Letcher, T.M. (202023). Unraveling Environmental Disasters., 2nd Edition. Academic Press, Amsterdam, Netherlands and Boston MA, ISBN 9780443186516. 710 pages.
- Vallero, D.A. (2023). Applications and Calculations in Environmental Physics, 1st Edition. AIP Publishing, Melville, NY, Print Book ISBN 9780735424883 264 pages.
- Vallero, D.A. (2022). Methods and Calculations in Environmental Physics, 1st Edition. AIP Publishing, Melville, NY, Print Book ISBN 9780735424326 412 pages.
- Vallero, D.A. (2021). Environmental Systems Science: Theory and Practical Applications, 1st Edition. Academic Press, Amsterdam, Netherlands and Boston MA, Print Book ISBN 9780128219539 704 pages.
- Yadav, D., Kumar, P. Singh, P. and Vallero, D.A. Editors (2021). Hazardous Waste Management: An Overview of Advanced and Cost-Effective Solutions. 1st Edition. Academic Press, Amsterdam, Netherlands and Boston MA, Print Book ISBN 9780128150603 312 pages.
- Vallero, D.A. (2019). Air Pollution Calculations, 1st Edition. Academic Press, Amsterdam, Netherlands and Boston MA, Print Book ISBN 9780128243442 577 pages.
- Letcher, T.M. and Vallero, D.A. Editors (2019). Waste: A Handbook for Management. 2nd Edition. Academic Press, Amsterdam, Netherlands and Boston MA, Print Book ISBN 9780128150603 804 pages.
- Vallero, D.A. (2017). Translating Diverse Environmental Data into Reliable Information:How to Coordinate Evidence from Different Sources. 1st Edition. Academic Press, Amsterdam, Netherlands and Boston MA, Print Book ISBN 9780128124468 790 pages.
- Vallero, D.A. (2015). Environmental Biotechnology: A Biosystems Approach. 2nd Edition. Academic Press, Amsterdam, Netherlands and Boston MA, Print Book ISBN 9780124077768; eBook ISBN 9780124078970. 746 pages.
- Vallero, D.A. (2014). Fundamentals of Air Pollution, 5th Edition. Academic Press, Amsterdam, Netherlands and Boston MA, ISBN 9780124017337 950 pages. Named one of the best environmental books of all time by BookAuthority.
- Vallero, D.A. and Letcher, T.M. (2012). Unraveling Environmental Disasters. Academic Press, Amsterdam, Netherlands and Boston MA, ISBN 9780123970268. 492 pages. Winner of the American Library Association's Choice Outstanding Academic Titles Award. According to WorldCat, the book is held in 465 libraries
- Letcher, T.M. and Vallero, D.A. Editors (2011). Waste: A Handbook for Management Academic Press, Amsterdam, Netherlands and Boston MA, ISBN 9780123814753. 448 pages. According to WorldCat, the book is held in 331 libraries
- Vallero, D.A. (2010). Environmental Biotechnology: A Biosystems Approach. Academic Press, Amsterdam, Netherlands and Boston MA, ISBN 012375089X.750 pages. According to WorldCat, the book is held in 999 libraries
- Ratner, B.D., Hoffman, A.S., Schoen, F.J., Lemons, J.E., Dyro, J. Martinsen, O.G., Kyle, R., Preim, B., Batz, D., Grimnes, S., Vallero, D., Semmlow, J., Murry, W.B., Perez, R. and Bankman, I. (2009). Biomedical Engineering Desk Reference. Academic Press, Amsterdam, Netherlands and Boston MA, ISBN 0123746469. 948 pages.
- Vallero, D.A. and Brasier, C. (2008), Sustainable Design: The Science of Sustainability and Green Engineering. John Wiley and Sons, Inc., Hoboken, NJ, ISBN 0470130628. 350 pages. According to WorldCat, the book is held in 454 libraries
  - Reviewed by R.W. Peters in Environmental Progress Nov 8, 2008, v27 issue4, Book reviews - 2008 - Environmental Progress - Wiley Online Library
  - Reviewed by D.A. Vaccari in Choice Oct 2008 v46 i2 p334(1)
  - Reviewed by Amy Trendler in Library Journal Sept 1, 2008 v133 i14 p126(1)
  - Reviewed by Alanna Malone in GreenSource: The Magazine of Sustainable Design Aug 8, 2007, Reports
- Vallero, D.A. (2007). Fundamentals of Air Pollution, 4th Edition. Academic Press, Amsterdam, Netherlands and Boston MA, ISBN 0750682272. 400 pages. In 1868 libraries according to WorldCat
  - Reviewed by Don MacKay. Environmental Reviews 2008 v16 p181(1)
- Vallero, D.A., (2007). Biomedical Ethics for Engineers: Ethics and Decision Making in Biomedical and Biosystem Engineering. Academic Press, Amsterdam, Netherlands and Boston MA, ISBN 0750682272. 400 pages. In 1118 libraries according to WorldCat
- Vallero, D.A. and Vesilind, P.A.(2006). Socially Responsible Engineering. John Wiley and Sons, Inc., Hoboken, NJ, ISBN 0471787078. 384 pages. According to WorldCat, the book is held in 254 libraries.
  - Reviewed by Ray Bert. Civil Engineering Nov 2006 v76 i11 p71
  - Reviewed by Alex A. Karner, Science and Engineering Ethics 2010 16(2): 415–417
- Vallero, D.A. (2005). Paradigms Lost: Learning from Environmental Mistakes, Mishaps and Misdeeds. Elsevier Butterworth-Heinemann, Amsterdam, Netherlands and Boston MA, ISBN 0750678887. 688 pages. According to WorldCat, the book is held in 1153 libraries.
  - Reviewed by Ray Bert. Civil Engineering March 2006 v76 i3 p68
- Vallero, D.A. (2004). Environmental Contaminants: Assessment and Control. Academic Press, New York, NY, ISBN 0127100571. 832 pages. According to WorldCat, the book is held in 1153 libraries.
- Vallero, D.A. (2003). Engineering the Risks of Hazardous Wastes. Butterworth-Heinemann, Amsterdam, Netherlands and Boston MA, ISBN 0750677422. 306 pages (with contribution by J.J. Peirce). According to WorldCat, the book is held in 999 libraries
