= Engineers Without Borders =

Several non-governmental organizations

The term Engineers Without Borders (EWB; French: Ingénieurs sans frontières, ISF) is used by a number of non-governmental organizations in various countries to describe their activity based on engineering and oriented to international development work. All of these groups work worldwide to serve the needs of disadvantaged communities and people through engineering projects. Many EWB national groups are developed independently from each other, and so they are not all formally affiliated with each other, and their level of collaboration and organizational development varies. The majority of the EWB/ISF organizations are strongly linked to academia and to students, with many of them being student-led.

== History ==
The first organizations to bear the name were Ingénieurs sans frontières (ISF)-France, founded in 1982, and ISF-Spain and ISF-Italy, founded in the 1990s. EWB-Canada, one of the largest of the EWB organizations, was founded in the late 1990s. EWB-UK was founded with the support of EWB-Canada in 2001.

In the USA an organization called EWB-USA was founded at the University of Colorado Boulder in 2001 by Bernard Amadei. Amadei founded the organization after working in Belize and Costa Rica. The original chapter of EWB-USA is still a functioning chapter at the University of Colorado, working in Northern Rwanda (Although the University now has several EWB-USA chapters, the Rwanda chapter was the original). In the same year an organization called Engineers Without Frontiers USA was founded at Cornell University. This organization was later renamed Engineers for a Sustainable World following a dispute with EWB-USA over the name. Amadei retired from EWB-USA in 2024.

=== Selected EWB organizations ===
Engineers Without Borders – International

Members of EWB-International:

- Engineers Without Borders - Türkiye (Sınır Tanımayan Mühendisler Derneği) (EWB-TR) (https://ewb.org.tr/)
- Engineers Without Borders - Los Angeles
- Engineers Without Borders - Israel
- Engineers Without Borders (IUG Denmark 2001)
- Ingénieurs Sans Frontières (Belgium)
- Engineers Without Borders Germany (Ingenieure Ohne Grenzen e.V.) (Germany)
- Engineers Without Borders (India)
- Engineers Without Borders (Gabon)
- Engineers Without Borders (Palestine)
- Ingeniería Sin Fronteras (Argentina)
- Ingeniería Sin Fronteras (Chile)
- Engenheiros Sem Fronteiras (Brazil)
- Engineers Without Borders (Portugal) (EpDAH and TESE)
- Engineers Without Borders - Lebanon
- Engineers Without Borders - Pakistan
- Engineers Without Borders – USA
- Ingénieurs Sans Frontières - Cameroon
- Engineers Without Borders - Egypt
- Engineers Without Borders - Greece
- Engineers Without Borders - Kosovo
- Inzeneri bez Granici - Macedonia
- Ingenieros Sin Fronteras - Mexico
- Engineers Without Borders - Nepal
- Engineers Without Borders (Canada)
- Ingénieurs sans Frontières Québec
- Engineers Without Borders - Rwanda
- Engineers Without Borders Sweden (Ingenjörer utan gränser - Sverige) (EWB-Sweden)
- Ingeniører uten grenser - Norge (EWB-Norway)
- Engineers Without Borders - Iraq

Not members of EWB-International:

- Ingénieurs sans frontières (France)
- Ingeniería Sin Fronteras (España)
- Engineers Without Borders - Luxembourg
- Engineers Without Borders (UK)
- Engineers Without Borders (Australia)
- Insinöörit ilman rajoja ry (Finland)
- Engineers Without Borders (New Zealand)
- Engineers Without Borders (Ireland)
- Ingegneria Senza Frontiere (Italy)
- Ingénieurs sans frontières - Russie (Russia)

=== International co-operation ===
Several of the EWB/ISF organizations are affiliated with the organization Engineers Without Borders - International (EWB-I). EWB-I is an association of national EWB/ISF groups with the mission to facilitate collaboration, exchange of information, and assistance among its member groups. EWB-I was founded in 2004 by Prof. Bernard Amadei, the founder of EWB-USA.

Several other older EWB/ISF groups are not members of EWB-I, for a variety of reasons. EWB Canada, for example, states: "An organization is more than just a name and roughly similar goals. In order to work together, the organizations must have a common strategy and culture, neither of which are currently present in the international network." Many of the organizations which are not EWB-I members, such as EWB-Canada, ISF-Spain, EWB-UK, and others, do collaborate with each other and with other similar groups.

== Impact in the community ==
Researchers have identified different levels of community member participation, such as passive participation, initiative and leadership, and decision making in projects across the globe. In order to have a true impact, students, professionals, and communities are given clearly identified roles for their participation in the project. The students' role consists of being open and willing to learn from the problems at hand and the methodologies used in the projects. Professional engineers are expected to fill the role of technical experts in the proven methods that are used and to communicate with students and community members. The communities are given the role of communicating with the assisting engineers and are actively encouraged to take participatory and leadership roles in the decision making of the project methodology. Education is a major part of Engineers without Borders and all participants are expected to learn from one another. The three levels of participation which are used by Engineers without Borders are as follows: low (monetary contribution), middle (manual labor), and high (decision making and leadership positions). All of these roles are considered to be important for the projects to be successful.

Most Engineers without Borders projects focus on water and deal with sanitation, distribution, and management of water sources. One example of a completed water project is the River Basin Management project in Palestine. River management can be very important in situations where the river provides the only source of drinking water. Projects of this nature can be extremely difficult, as the presence of biological barriers can prevent workers from making major environmental changes. Because of this, it can make it difficult to quantify the effectiveness of Engineers without Borders projects.

=== Educators ===
As educators in the Engineering field, teachers play a large role in the projects by Engineers without Borders. There are many examples of the ways in which Engineers without Borders takes on the challenge of educating students. These examples are explained in studies that focus on types of study abroad programs (such as EWB) that currently exist and the best practices that have been found in the programs. One graduate class of nine students who study design, engineering, technology, were taught about science education programs and service learning in hopes to bridge the gap between males and females as currently the engineering field is dominated by males with only 11% of the workforce being female. This class was taught in order to shine a light onto the gender inequality issues in the Engineering field. The programs have their challenges, such as lack of faculty interest and involvement.

=== Students ===
Engineers Without Borders has created a way to train engineering students in technical and nontechnical skills. The model of education that Engineers Without Borders uses is called service learning, which consists of students getting experience by building infrastructure in struggling third world communities. This model builds on academic literature that claims engineering professions should focus on sustainability. One example of this model of teaching was the Engineering in Developing Countries (EDC) program at the University of Colorado at Boulder. The program had students from both engineering and non-engineering disciplines address a wide range of issues such as water provisioning, food production, health, and shelter. There are an increasing rate of cases where students create prototypes by using natural resources including wood, mud, and the land itself. Wood Science is an accredited field in the engineering world; and one example of wood science being active is a pilot program called "Wood Scientists Without Borders" which was established with a goal to encourage more engineering students to participate in wood science. This program has worked closely with Engineers without Borders to build infrastructure out of wood and use the resources that are provided in the natural world. Another example of students using natural resources is through mud brick constructions which consist of cost savings, thermal mass, eco friendliness, self-satisfaction, and aesthetics. Mud bricks have become a process and method for engineering students to help build and rebuild communities that have been destroyed by natural or manmade disasters. In 2009 it was found that using mud bricks to rebuild houses that were destroyed in ways such as ecological degradation, natural disasters, or political turmoil, was a cheap and efficient way to rebuild infrastructure; and today 30% of the world's present population live in earthen structures. Director of Engineering Service Corps of the USA - Engineers Without Borders, El-Omari presented a re-construction project to the United Nations where Engineers Without Borders would use the area behind the living areas of refugees to dig wells and bring water to the Ein Sultan Refugee camp. According to the Engineers without Borders website, they work with students to bridge the gap between the learning environment in schools and the "real" world problems that are found in today's world.

== See also ==
- Volunteering
- Pro bono
