= Engineers Without Borders – Lebanon =

Non-profit organization

- Abbreviation: EWB–Lebanon
- Formation: 31 December 2009
- Type: NGO
- Purpose: Community development
- Headquarters: Beirut, Lebanon
- Members: 450
- President: Nader Hajj Shehadeh
- Parent organization: ewb-international.org
- Website: ewb-lebanon.org

Engineers Without Borders – Lebanon (EWB–Lebanon) is a non-profit group of engineers dedicated to public work and sustainable development. The group aims to help disadvantaged communities throughout Lebanon.

== Establishment ==
EWB – Lebanon was founded as a recognized start-group working under the close guidance of Engineers Without Borders - International, a non-profit corporation established in November 2002 in the State of Colorado, United States with regional offices in Mexico, India, Belgium, and Egypt.

EWB-Lebanon has university chapters in Lebanon universities allowing engineering students to join the group and participate in engineering development activities. There were more than 250 student members in 2015 in EWB-Lebanon chapters at Notre Dame University – Louaize, American University of Beirut, Lebanese American University, and University of Balamand. The first chapter includes started in 2011 at under the support and supervision of the Faculty of Engineering at Notre Dame University – Louaize main campus in Zouk Mosbeh.

EWB-Lebanon was established to use the engineering knowledge and skills of its members to promote sustainable development.

== Selected activities ==
=== Beekeeping for Poverty Alleviation and Sustainable Rural Livelihood ===
EWB-Lebanon implements development in agricultural rural areas in Lebanon. The project entitled "Beekeeping for Poverty Alleviation and Sustainable Rural Livelihood" aims at supporting poor families in rural regions through introducing the concept of sustainable beekeeping and providing them with education, financial support, and technical cooperation in the field. Targeting the poorest regions of the country, the project identifies underdeveloped families with good potential but no financial or technical abilities, to help them develop an additional riskless source of income.

=== Environment Awareness Lectures ===
EWB Students from university chapters at the American University in Beirut (AUB), Notre Dame University (NDU), University of Balamand (UOB), and the Lebanese American University (LAU) join hands to help the people in need at Sesobel. The project aimed at implementing energy saving solutions at the Sesobel headquarters in Aintoura, and was jointly implemented with the private company Solar World which supplied LED lamps and solar water heaters.

=== Participation in SEEM 2010 ===
From March 3 to 6, 2010, EWB-Lebanon, represented by its founder and acting president, Nader Hajj Shehadeh, made the first appearance within the EWB-International Network in the Second Annual Meeting of the Eastern Mediterranean Region at EWB held in Larnaca, Cyprus, under the title "Sustainable Engineering in the Eastern Mediterranean". EWB-Lebanon discussed with the participants the future plans of the newest EWB group.

=== Development of "Turbocycler I"- Human-Powered Water Pump ===
EWB- Lebanon Team developed a multi-purpose bicycle kit that is used for cycling, water pumping, and electricity generation. The "Turbocycler I" was developed as a demonstration kit to illustrate electricity-independent power generation in its mechanical and electrical forms.

The model is built using an old mountain bike plugged into a frame with a 0.5 hp centrifugal pump attached to the flywheel of the back tire through a metallic chain.
