= Engineers Without Borders - Cameroon =

Non-profit organization founded in 2003

Engineers Without Borders (EWB) is a Cameroonian non-profit organization founded on 14 October 2003 in Yaoundé, Cameroon. As a development-based association, Engineers Without Borders - Cameroon works to promote human development by sharing and giving access to relevant scientific and technological knowledge, implementing engineering projects with respect for the environment, economic and social adaptation, and developing partnership and synergy within the engineering domain.

It is a member of the network Engineers Without Borders International.

== History ==
The group was created in 2003. It is supported by numerous members of academia. EWB Cameroon works on knowledge management, local development, natural resources management, and information and communication for development.

- In 2005, EWB Cameroon organised a campaign on entrepreneurship for young people in rural areas and led the mobilization of Cameroonian youth for the World Summit in Information Society.
- In 2011, the group began producing articles and organising training sessions and technical assistance missions.
- In 2015, they launched a national contest of excellency « graines d’ingénierie ». That year, the group partnered with "Ingénieurs sans frontières France" to study the « evolution of agricultural engineers skills from counselling to follow-up.
- EWB-DC completed trip to Cameroon during March 2016. This was the fourth implementation trip for the team. One of the trip's main objectives was to continue the pipeline installation from a water catchment area to the location of a future storage tank. After three days of manual labor, approximately 360 meters of pipeline were successfully installed.

== Leadership ==
- 2003: Emilienne Lionelle Ngo Samnick
- 2006: Élisabeth Basemeg Kihel
- 2009: Dénis Sie Mahonghol
- 2015: Jean Merlin Etobe
