= George Roter =

Canadian businessman (born 1976)

- Born: October 20, 1976 (age 48); Montreal, Quebec, Canada
- Known for: CEO of Engineers Without Borders (Canada)

George Roter (born October 20, 1976) is the co-founder and former CEO of Engineers Without Borders (Canada). He and Parker Mitchell founded the Canadian organization in 2000.

Roter received a bachelor's degree in mechanical engineering from the University of Waterloo and left part-way through his master's degree to focus full-time on Engineers Without Borders. His area of research was orthopaedic tribology, particularly studying hip implants under John B. Medley.

Roter lives in Toronto. In 2004, he was selected to be on Canada's Top 40 Under 40 list.

== See also ==
- List of University of Waterloo people
