= Engineers Without Borders (Palestine) =

Palestinian non-governmental non-profit

Engineers Without Borders (EWB) Palestine (or EWB-Palestine; Arabic: مهندسون بلا حدود) is a Palestine-based registered charity and NGO. Its mission is to "partner with Palestinian disadvantaged communities to improve their quality of life through the implementation of environmentally and economically sustainable engineering projects, while developing internationally responsible engineers and engineering students."

EWB-Palestine is the Palestinian national representative within the Engineers Without Borders International Group.

== EWB-Palestine History ==
In August 2005, EWB-Palestine was created as a provisional member of EWB-International. In July 2006, it was registered as a nonprofit organization with the Ministry of the Interior in Palestine. In September 2008, EWB-Palestine was represented on the EWB-International board of directors.
