= Parker Mitchell =

Canadian businessman

Parker Mitchell is the co-founder and former co-CEO of Engineers Without Borders (Canada). He and George Roter founded the Canadian organization in 2000.

Mitchell has a bachelor's degree in mechanical engineering and a B.A. (Cognitive Science minor) from the University of Waterloo, and a Masters in Development Studies from the University of Cambridge, as well as an honorary Doctor of Engineering, also from the University of Waterloo.

In 2004, he was selected to be on Canada's Top 40 Under 40 list.

== See also ==
- List of University of Waterloo people
