= Zonda =

Zonda may refer to:

- Pagani Zonda, a mid-engine sports car
- Zonda (horse), retired New Zealand Thoroughbred racehorse
- Zonda Department, an administrative subdivision of San Juan Province in Argentina
- Zonda Home, a publisher of data related to real estate in North America
- Zonda Telecom, a Mexican telecommunications company
- Zonda wind, a regional term for the foehn wind that often occurs on the eastern slope of the Andes, in Argentina
