= Engineers Without Borders (Belgium) =

Belgian non-governmental organization

Ingénieurs sans Frontières - Ingénieurs Assistance Internationale (ISF-IAI, more commonly known as ISF, Belgium) is a Belgian NGO assisting developing areas of the world with their engineering needs and whose fundamental purpose is to adapt technological development to the needs of those living in underprivileged areas.

== Overview ==
It should not be confused with Ingenieurs zonder Grenzen (Dutch for "Engineers Without Borders").

Founded on the initiative of a few engineers and with the support of the Associations of Schools for Engineers (FABI), ISF can count on the contribution of several hundred volunteers: engineers with varying qualifications and students willing to put their time and skills at the disposal of development projects.

Thanks to many contacts in both professional and associative environment, ISF can seek advice from engineers and technicians on specific problems in every sector of technology. All ISF work is done on a voluntary basis.

ISF, looking for collaboration with other Belgian NGOs, has formed the CHAKA group with CODEART and ADG, both Belgian associations. ISF is also a member of the Federation of the French and German speaking NGOs of Belgium (ACODEV) and is approved by the General Directorate for International Cooperation of the Belgian Federal Government (DGCI).

ISF is also a member of EWB-International (Engineers Without Borders International Network)

== See also ==
- Ingenieurs zonder Grenzen - Belgian "Engineers Without Borders" organisations, with a Dutch name.
- Without Borders
