= Green engineering =

Green engineering approaches the design of products and processes by applying financially and technologically feasible principles to achieve one or more of the following goals: (1) decrease in the amount of pollution that is generated by a construction or operation of a facility, (2) minimization of human population exposure to potential hazards (including reducing toxicity), (3) improved uses of matter and energy throughout the life cycle of the product and processes, and (4) maintaining economic efficiency and viability. Green engineering can be an overarching framework for all design disciplines.

== History ==
The concept of green engineering began between 1966 and 1970 during the Organization for Economic Cooperation and Development under the name: "The Ten Ecological Commandments for Earth Citizens". The idea was expressed visually as the following cycle starting with the first commandment and ending with the tenth:

1. Respect the laws of nature
2. Learn as responsible earth citizens from the wisdom of nature
3. Do not reduce plurality richness, abundance of living species
4. Do not pollute
5. Face earth-responsibility every day for our children and our children's children
6. Follow the principle of nature precaution/sustainability in all economic activities!
7. Act as you speak!
8. Prefer small clever and intelligent problem solutions, including rational and emotional intelligence factors
9. Information about environmental damage belongs to mankind - not (only) to privilieged big business
10. Listen carefully [to] what your own body tells you about [the] impact of your very personal social and natural environment upon your wellbeing

The idea was then presented by Peter Menke-Glückert at the United Nations Educational, Scientific, and Cultural Conference at Paris in 1968. These principles are similar to the Principles of Green Engineering in that each individual has an intrinsic responsibility to uphold these values. The Ten Ecological Commandments for Earth Citizens is thought by Dr. Płotka-Wasylka to have influenced The Principles of Green Engineering, which has been said to imply that all engineers have a duty to uphold sustainable values and practices when creating new processes.

Green engineering is a part of a larger push for sustainable practices in the creation of products such as chemical compounds. This movement is more widely known as green chemistry, and has been headed since 1991 by Paul Anastas and John C. Warner. Green chemistry, being older than green engineering, is a more researched field of study and began in 1991 with the creation of the 12 Principles of Green Chemistry.

=== 12 Principles of Green Engineering ===
On May 19, 2003, Paul Anastas along with his future wife, Julie Zimmerman created the 12 Principles of Green Engineering. This expanded upon the 12 Principles of Green Chemistry to not only include the guidelines for what an environmentally conscious chemical should be in theory, but also what steps should be followed to create an environmentally conscious alternative to the chemical. Environmentally conscious thought can be applied to engineering disciplines such as civil and mechanical engineers when considering practices with negative environmental impacts, such as concrete hydration. These principles still were centered around chemical processes, with about half pertaining to engineers. There are many ways that both the 12 Principles of Green Chemistry and 12 Principles of Green Engineering interact, referred to by Tse-Lun Chen et al. as "cross connections". Every one Principle of Green Engineering has one or more corresponding "cross connections" to Principles of Green Chemistry. For example, principle 1 of green engineering is "Inherent Rather than Circumstantial", which has cross connections to principles 1, 3, and 8 of green chemistry.

=== 9 Principles of Green Engineering ===
On May 19, 2003, during a conference at the Sandestin Resort in Florida, a group consisting of about 65 chemists, engineers, and government officials met to create a narrowed down set of green principles relating to engineers and engineering. After 4 days of debating and proposals, the Sandestin Declaration was created. This declaration established the 9 Principles of Green Engineering, which narrowed down the focus to processes engineers can abide by, with a focus on designing processes and products with the future in mind. The resulting 9 Principles were later supported and recognized by The U.S. Environmental Protection Agency, National Science Foundation, Department of Energy (Los Alamos National Laboratory), and the ACS Green Chemistry institute.

== Principles ==
Green engineering follows nine guiding principles:

1. Engineer processes and products holistically, use systems analysis and integrate environmental impact assessment tools.
2. Conserve and improve natural ecosystems while protecting human health and well-being.
3. Use life-cycle thinking in all engineering activities.
4. Ensure that all material and energy inputs and outputs are as inherently safe and benign as possible.
5. Minimize the depletion of natural resources.
6. Prevent waste.
7. Develop and apply engineering solutions while being cognizant of local geography, aspirations, and cultures.
8. Create engineering solutions beyond current or dominant technologies; improve, innovate, and invent (technologies) to achieve sustainability.
9. Actively engage communities and stakeholders in development of engineering solutions.

In 2003, The American Chemical Society introduced a new list of twelve principles:

1. Inherent Rather Than Circumstantial – Designers need to strive to ensure that all materials and energy inputs and outputs are as inherently nonhazardous as possible.
2. Prevention Instead of Treatment – It is better to prevent waste than to treat or clean up waste after it is formed.
3. Design for Separation – Separation and purification operations should be designed to minimize energy consumption and materials use.
4. Maximize Efficiency – Products, processes, and systems should be designed to maximize mass, energy, space, and time efficiency.
5. Output-Pulled Versus Input-Pushed – Products, processes, and systems should be "output pulled" rather than "input pushed" through the use of energy and materials.
6. Conserve Complexity – Embedded entropy and complexity must be viewed as an investment when making design choices on recycling, reuse, or beneficial disposition.
7. Durability Rather Than Immortality – Targeted durability, not immortality, should be a design goal.
8. Meet Need, Minimize Excess – Design for unnecessary capacity or capability (e.g., "one size fits all") solutions should be considered a design flaw.
9. Minimize Material Diversity – Material diversity in multicomponent products should be minimized to promote disassembly and value retention.
10. Integrate Material and Energy Flows – Design of products, processes, and systems must include integration and interconnectivity with available energy and materials flows.
11. Design for Commercial "Afterlife" – Products, processes, and systems should be designed for performance in a commercial "afterlife."
12. Renewable Rather Than Depleting – Material and energy inputs should be renewable rather than depleting.

== Systems approach ==
Many engineering disciplines engage in green engineering. This includes sustainable design, life cycle analysis (LCA), pollution prevention, design for the environment (DfE), design for disassembly (DfD), and design for recycling (DfR). As such, green engineering is a subset of sustainable engineering. Green engineering involves four basic approaches to improve processes and products to make them more efficient from an environmental standpoint.

1. Waste reduction;
2. Materials management;
3. Pollution prevention; and,
4. Product enhancement.

Green engineering approaches design from a systematic perspective which integrates numerous professional disciplines. In addition to all engineering disciplines, green engineering includes land use planning, architecture, landscape architecture, and other design fields, as well as the social sciences(e.g. to determine how various groups of people use products and services. Green engineers are concerned with space, the sense of place, viewing the site map as a set of fluxes across the boundary, and considering the combinations of these systems over larger regions, e.g. urban areas. The life cycle analysis is an important green engineering tool, which provides a holistic view of the entirety of a product, process or activity, encompassing raw materials, manufacturing, transportation, distribution, use, maintenance, recycling, and final disposal. Assessing its life cycle should yield a complete picture of the product. The first step in a life cycle assessment is to gather data on the flow of a material through an identifiable society. Once the quantities of various components of such a flow are known, the important functions and impacts of each step in the production, manufacture, use, and recovery/disposal are estimated. In sustainable design, engineers must optimize for variables that give the best performance in temporal frames.

The system approach employed in green engineering is similar to value engineering (VE). Daniel A. Vallero has compared green engineering to be a form of VE because both systems require that all elements and linkages within the overall project be considered to enhance the value of the project. Every component and step of the system must be challenged. Ascertaining overall value is determined not only be a project's cost-effectiveness, but other values, including environmental and public health factors. Thus, the broader sense of VE is compatible with and can be identical to green engineering, since VE is aimed at effectiveness, not just efficiency, i.e. a project is designed to achieve multiple objectives, without sacrificing any important values. Efficiency is an engineering and thermodynamic term for the ratio of an input to an output of energy and mass within a system. As the ratio approaches 100%, the system becomes more efficient. Effectiveness requires that efficiencies be met for each component, but also that the integration of components lead to an effective, multiple value-based design. Green engineering is also a type of concurrent engineering, since tasks must be parallelized to achieve multiple design objectives.

== Implementation ==
=== Ionic liquids ===
An ionic liquid can be described simply as a salt in a liquid state, exhibiting triboelectric properties which allow it to be used as a lubricant. Traditional solvents are composed of oils or synthetic compounds, like fluorocarbons which, when airborne, can act as a greenhouse gas. Ionic liquids are nonvolatile and have high thermal stability and, as Lei states, "They present a "greener" alternative to standard solvents". Ionic liquids can also be used for carbon dioxide capture or as a component in bioethanol production in the gasification process.

=== Ceramic tiles ===
Ceramic tile production is typically an energy and water-intensive process. Ceramic tile milling is similar to cement milling for concrete, where there is both a dry and wet milling process. Wet milling typically produces a higher quality tile at a higher cost of energy and water, while dry milling would produce a lower quality material at a lower cost.

== See also ==
- Civil engineering
- Ecotechnology
- Environmental engineering science
- Environmental engineering
- Environmental technology
- Exposure assessment
- Green building
- Greening
- Hazard (risk)
- Life cycle assessment
- Process engineering
- Risk assessment
- Sustainable engineering
- Systems engineering
