= Ingenieurs zonder Grenzen =

Belgian organizations

Ingenieurs zonder Grenzen (Dutch for Engineers Without Borders) is a name used by two Belgian organizations, both of which are provisional members of the Engineers Without Borders International network.

== See also ==
- Engineers Without Borders (Belgium)
