= Engineers Without Borders (Australia) =

Australian non-profit organization

Engineers Without Borders Australia (EWB) is an Australian non-profit organisation with 20 active chapters, operating nationally and internationally with the published aim of improving the quality of life of disadvantaged communities through education and the implementation of sustainable engineering projects. EWB Australia was established in 2003 by a group of engineers from Melbourne who were motivated to take action on the developmental front through engineering.

In its declaration of aims on its website, EWB Australia outlines four principal areas of focus:

1. Clean Water, Sanitation and Hygiene
2. Appropriate Housing
3. Clean Energy
4. Digital Access

EWB espouses a strengths-based approach to sustainable development and advocates the creation of systemic change through humanitarian engineering. The EWB declares support for the UN Sustainable Development Goals, whose 17 goal areas it regards as replacing the Millennium Development Goals, using them as part of the framework through which it operates in partnership with developing communities.

The organisation offers assistance to entrepreneurs, ranging from problem identification to the design, implementation and support of solutions, with an emphasis on education and training. EWB engages with engineering students, professionals in the industry as well as the broader community in three key areas: Programs (Projects), Education and Advocacy.

In its 2005 Conference held at the University of Melbourne, "necessary steps and actions to foster effective development at the grass roots, and identify the social, cultural, economic, and environmental aspects of development work" were tabled for debate. At its Engage 2009 National Conference, prominent reporter Eric Campbell gave a talk entitled 'Reporting on the World'. The 2011 Conference was held at Fremantle with a focus on "undergraduate engineering experience, with engineering academics from all around the world presenting on their research and practice".

In 2017 EWB granted an Innovation Award to students at the University of Canterbury (New Zealand)

In Financial Year 2019, EWB reported AUD$4.6mil in income.
