= Engineers Without Borders – USA =

American non-profit organization

- Abbreviation: EWB–USA
- Formation: Incorporated June 2002
- Type: NGO
- Purpose: Community development
- Headquarters: Boulder, Colorado
- CEO: Boris Martin
- Parent organization: Engineers Without Borders
- Affiliations: American Society of Civil Engineers
- Website: www.ewb-usa.org

Engineers Without Borders – USA (EWB–USA) is a non-profit humanitarian organization. It represents the United States within the larger international Engineers Without Borders organization. Within the U.S., the organization focuses on sustainable engineering projects with both local and international communities, while involving and training professional engineers and students. As of 2026, the current CEO of EWB-USA is Boris Martin.

There are currently 202 chapters within the United States, separated into 147 collegiate and 55 professional groups. Some notable EWB-USA collegiate chapters are in universities like the University of California, Los Angeles (UCLA), Tufts University, and Purdue University.

== History ==
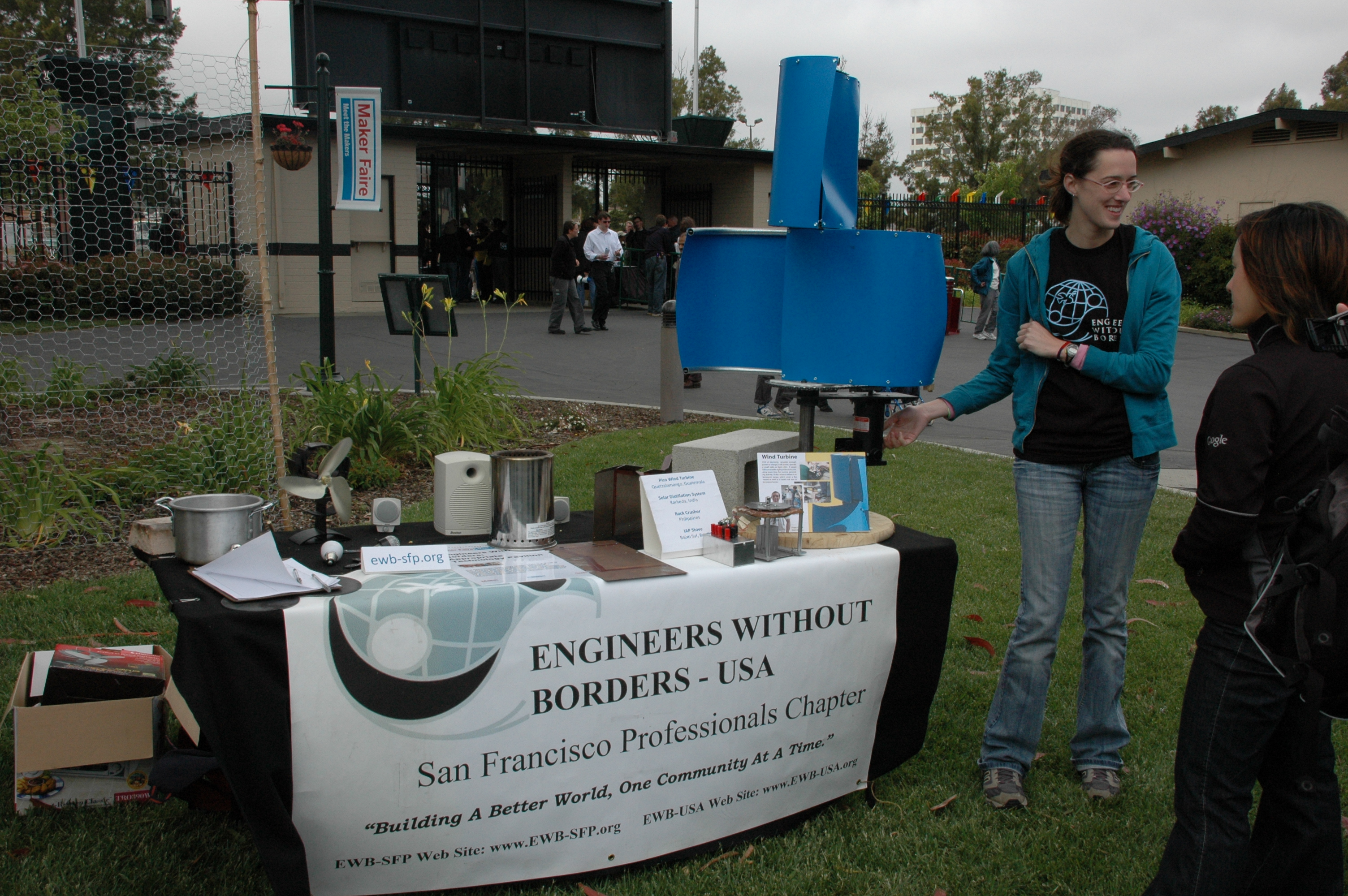
Engineers Without Borders at Maker Faire in 2008

Engineers Without Borders - USA (EWB-USA) was founded in 2002 in Boulder, Colorado by Bernard Amadei, a professor of civil engineering at University of Colorado Boulder, and Angel Tzec, a landscaper and representative of the Belize Ministry of Agriculture. After visiting Tzec's village in San Pablo, Belize, Dr. Amadei returned with eight University of Colorado Boulder students and Denis Walsh, a civil engineering expert in Boulder, Colorado. While there, the team designed and implemented a clean water system for the community that was driven by local rainfall. The entire project cost $14,000 and directly led to the founding of EWB-USA.

In September of 2024, Engineering World Health (EWH) merged with Engineers Without Borders - USA. EWH was a non-profit humanitarian organization founded in 2001 that worked with local hospitals and clinics in resource-limited regions in Asia, Africa, and Latin America. Specifically, the organization focused on repairing and maintaining medical equipment while also improving local capacity to manage and maintain equipment without international aid. According to CEO Boris Martin, the goal of the merger was to incorporate the biomedical equipment and technical training from EWH into the infrastructure projects of EWB-USA.

In November of 2025, the Society of Exploration Geophysicists (SEG), alongside its humanitarian organization, Geoscientists Without Borders (GWB), entered into a Memorandum of Understanding (MOU) with Engineers Without Borders - USA. GWB is a humanitarian program that specializes in applying geoscience towards sustainable engineering projects. Some examples include locating clean groundwater and mapping natural hazards. The purpose of the agreement was to improve collaboration among the two organizations including implementing collaborative projects, facilitating volunteer participation, and sharing technical knowledge.

Today, EWB-USA has expanded into American universities and professional chapters, with over 9,500 members operating in over 40 countries as of 2019. According to the organization itself, EWB-USA has completed over 1,000 projects since 2002 that have benefited over 5 million people globally.

== Organizational structure ==
The leadership of Engineers Without Borders - USA consists of program coordinators and engineers, along with administrative leadership and a Board of Directors. As of 2026, the current structure is as follows:

Chief Executive Officer: Boris Martin

Chief Programs Officer: Melissa Montgomery

Program Director of Domestic Programs: Natalie Celmo

Director of Systems & Volunteer Engagement: Miranda Mallory

Director of Fundraising & Communication: Cait Shoutta

Marketing & Development Strategist: Kellianne McClain

Corporate Engagement Manager: Hailey Dickerson

Global Health & Safety Manager: Marin Brownell

Senior Accountant: Rosa Rivas

Salesforce & Systems Administrator: Yoshi Akutsu

AP/AR Specialist: Lauren Struck

Major Gifts Officer: Jayme Ward

Among the Board of Directors are employees of Denver International Airport, Pratt & Whitney, Mitre Corporation, and multiple American universities.
