= Sustainable engineering =

Engineering discipline

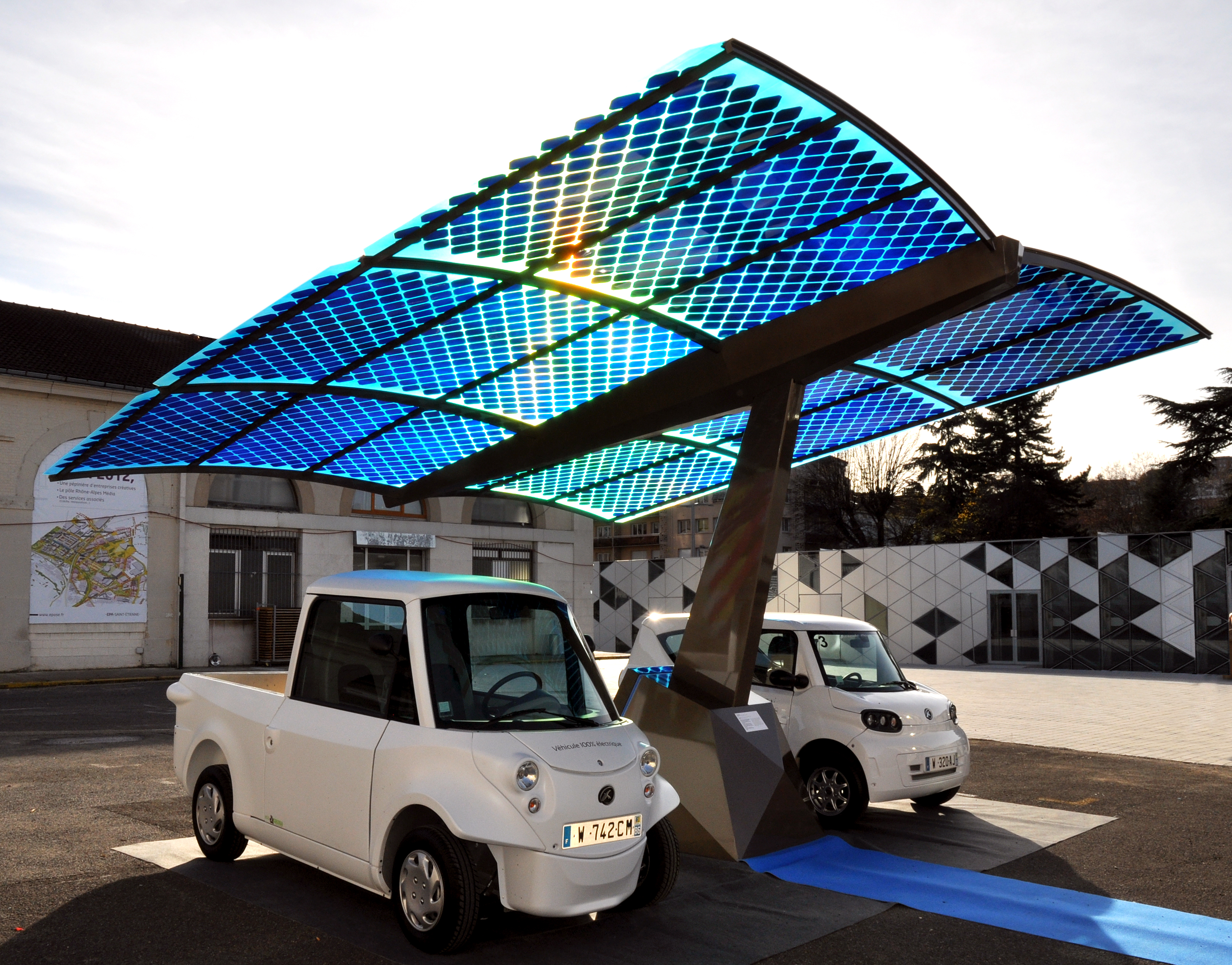
Sustainable urban design and innovation: Photovoltaic ombrière SUDI is an autonomous and mobile station that replenishes energy for electric vehicles using solar energy.

Sustainable engineering is the process of designing or operating systems such that they use energy and resources sustainably, in other words, at a rate that does not compromise the natural environment, or the ability of future generations to meet their own needs.

== Common engineering focuses ==
Sustainable engineering focuses on the following:

- Water supply
- Food production
- Housing and shelter
- Sanitation and waste management
- Energy development
- Transportation
- Industrial processing
- Development of natural resources
- Cleaning up polluted waste sites
- Planning projects to reduce environmental and social impacts
- Restoring natural environments such as forests, lakes, streams, and wetlands
- Providing medical care to those in need
- Minimizing and responsibly disposing of waste to benefit all
- Improving industrial processes to eliminate waste and reduce consumption
- Recommending the appropriate and innovative use of technology

== Aspects of engineering disciplines ==
Every engineering discipline is engaged in sustainable design, employing numerous initiatives, especially life cycle analysis (LCA), pollution prevention, Design for the Environment (DfE), Design for Disassembly (DfD), and Design for Recycling (DfR). These are replacing or at least changing pollution control paradigms.

For example, concept of a "cap and trade" has been tested and works well for some pollutants. This is a system where companies are allowed to place a "bubble" over a whole manufacturing complex or trade pollution credits with other companies in their industry instead of a "stack-by-stack" and "pipe-by-pipe" approach, i.e. the so-called "command and control" approach. Such policy and regulatory innovations call for some improved technology based approaches as well as better quality-based approaches, such as leveling out the pollutant loadings and using less expensive technologies to remove the first large bulk of pollutants, followed by higher operation and maintenance (O&M) technologies for the more difficult to treat stacks and pipes.

But, the net effect can be a greater reduction of pollutant emissions and effluents than treating each stack or pipe as an independent entity. This is a foundation for most sustainable design approaches, i.e. conducting a life-cycle analysis, prioritizing the most important problems, and matching the technologies and operations to address them.

The problems will vary by size (e.g. pollutant loading), difficulty in treating, and feasibility. The most intractable problems are often those that are small but very expensive and difficult to treat, i.e. less feasible. Of course, as with all paradigm shifts, expectations must be managed from both a technical and an operational perspective. Historically, sustainability considerations have been approached by engineers as constraints on their designs. For example, hazardous substances generated by a manufacturing process were dealt with as a waste stream that must be contained and treated. The hazardous waste production had to be constrained by selecting certain manufacturing types, increasing waste handling facilities, and if these did not entirely do the job, limiting rates of production. Green engineering recognizes that these processes are often inefficient economically and environmentally, calling for a comprehensive, systematic life cycle approach. Green engineering attempts to achieve four goals:

1. Waste reduction
2. Materials management
3. Pollution prevention and
4. Product enhancement.

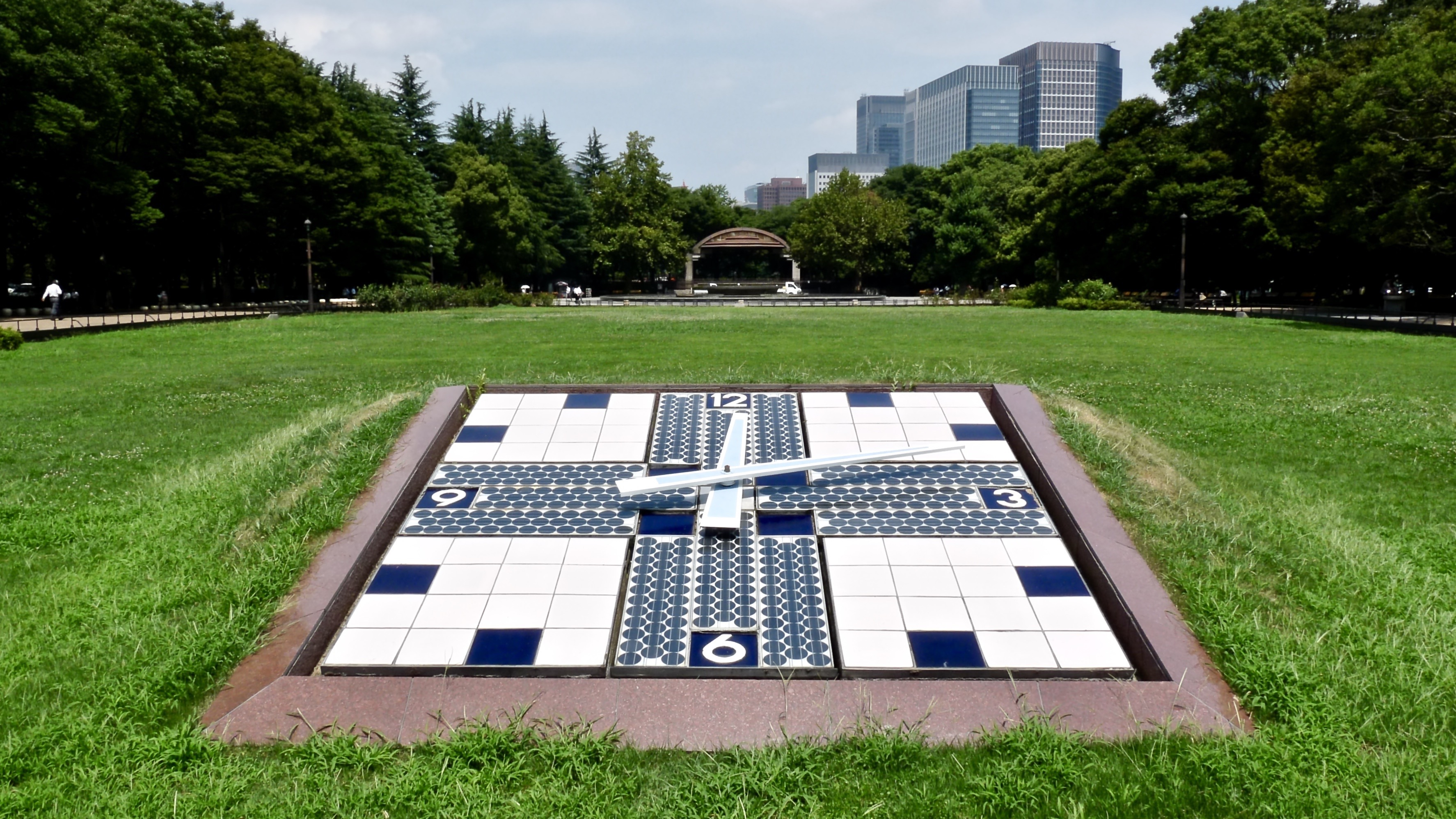
Worlds first solar clock built in 1983, located in Hibiya Park, Japan. Tile clock in a field of grass with Solar panels located perpendicular of each other, going towards 12 o'clock, 6 o'clock, 3 o'clock and 9 o'clock. The clock hands move every minute with energy provided from the sun. This was built to help with sustainable engineering and the environment.

Green engineering encompasses numerous ways to improve processes and products to make them more efficient from an environmental and sustainable standpoint. Every one of these approaches depends on viewing possible impacts in space and time. Architects consider the sense of place. Engineers view the site map as a set of fluxes across the boundary. The design must consider short and long-term impacts. Those impacts beyond the near-term are the province of sustainable design.

The effects may not manifest themselves for decades. In the mid-twentieth century, designers specified the use of what are now known to be hazardous building materials, such as asbestos flooring, pipe wrap and shingles, lead paint and pipes, and even structural and mechanical systems that may have increased the exposure to molds and radon. Those decisions have led to health risks to the inhabitants. It is easy in retrospect to criticize these decisions, but many were made for noble reasons, such as fire prevention and durability of materials. However, it does illustrate that seemingly small impacts when viewed through the prism of time can be amplified exponentially in their effects.

Sustainable design requires a complete assessment of a design in place and time. Some impacts may not occur until centuries in the future. For example, the extent to which we decide to use nuclear power to generate electricity is a sustainable design decision. The radioactive wastes may have half-lives of hundreds of thousands of years, meaning it will take all these years for half of the radioactive isotopes to decay. Radioactive decay is the spontaneous transformation of one element into another. This occurs by irreversibly changing the number of protons in the nucleus. Thus, sustainable designs of such enterprises must consider highly uncertain futures. For example, even if we properly place warning signs about these hazardous wastes, we do not know if the English language will be understood.

All four goals of green engineering mentioned above are supported by a long-term, life cycle point of view. A life cycle analysis is a holistic approach to consider the entirety of a product, process or activity, encompassing raw materials, manufacturing, transportation, distribution, use, maintenance, recycling, and final disposal. In other words, assessing its life cycle should yield a complete picture of the product.

The first step in a life-cycle assessment is to gather data on the flow of a material through an identifiable society. Once the quantities of various components of such a flow are known, the important functions and impacts of each step in the production, manufacture, use, and recovery/disposal are estimated. Thus, in sustainable design, engineers must optimize for variables that give the best performance in temporal frames.

== Accomplishments from 1992 to 2002 ==
- The World Engineering Partnership for Sustainable Development (WEPSD) was formed and they are responsible for the following areas: redesign engineering responsibilities and ethic to sustainable development, analyze and develop a long-term plan, find solution by exchanging information with partners and using new technologies, and solve the critical global environment problems, such as fresh water and climate change
- CASI Global was formed mainly as a platform for corporates and governments to share best practices; with a mission to promote the cause and knowledge of csr & sustainability. Thousands of corporates and colleges across the world are now a part of CASI Global with a view to support this mission. CASI also offers Global Fellow programs on finance / operations / manufacturing / supply chain / etc. with a dual specialization in Sustainability. The idea is every professional has inculcate sustainability within their core function & industry.
- Developed environmental policies, codes of ethics, and sustainable development guidelines
- Earth Charter was restarted as a civil society initiative
- The World Bank, United Nations Environmental Program, and the Global Environment Facility joined programs for sustainable development
- Launched programs for engineering students and practicing engineers on how to apply sustainable development concepts in their work
- Developed new approaches in industrial processes

== Sustainable housing ==
In 2013, the average annual electricity consumption for a U.S. residential utility customer was 10,908 kilowatt hours (kWh), an average of 909 kWh per month. Louisiana had the highest annual consumption at 15,270 kWh, and Hawaii had the lowest at 6,176 kWh. Residential sector itself uses 18% of the total energy generated and therefore, incorporating sustainable construction practices there can be significant reduction in this number. Basic Sustainable construction practices include:

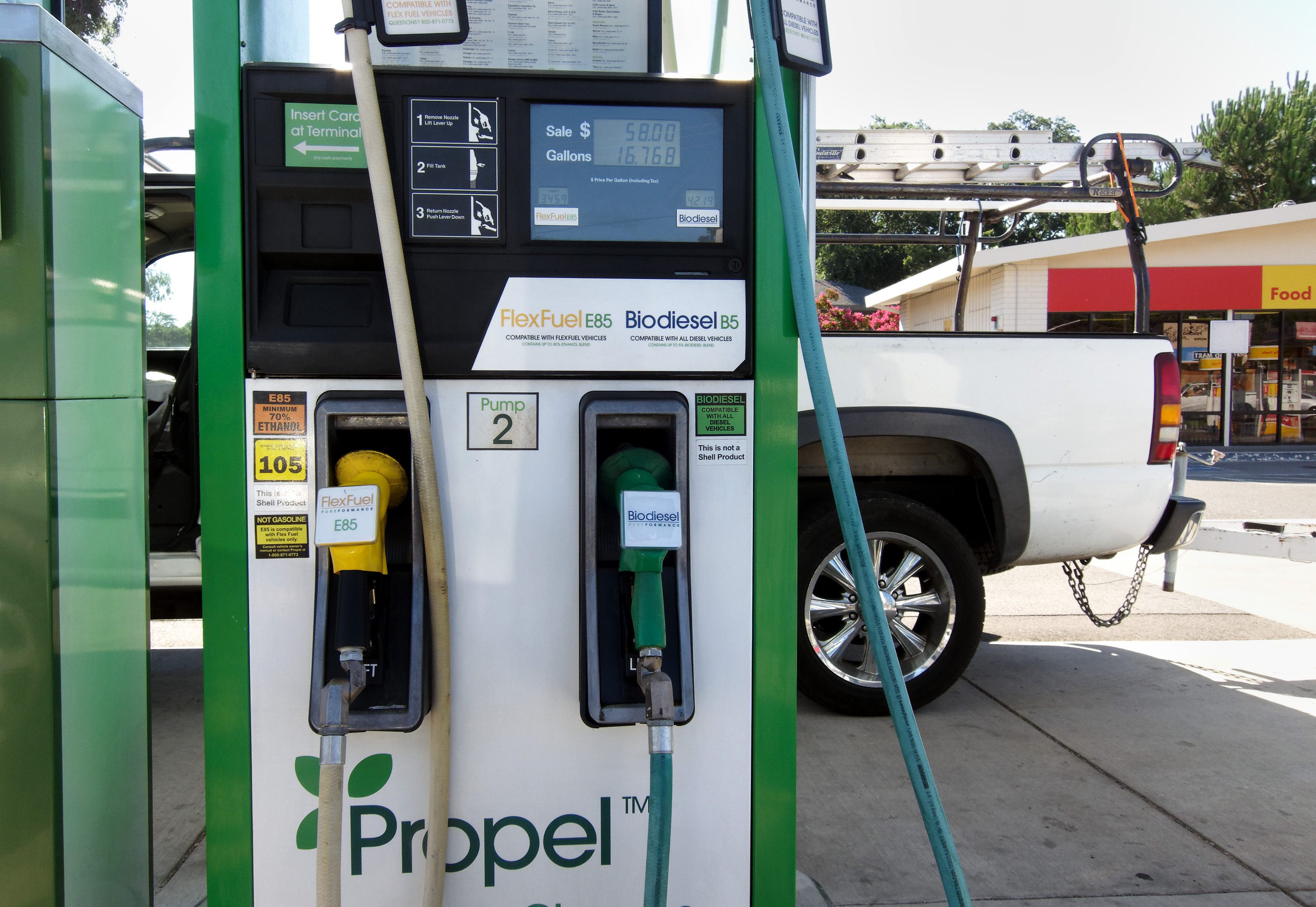
Green and White Propel gas pump with the labels biodiesel and FlexFuel on it. White pickup truck in background filling up gas tank. Gas pump has biodiesel fuel rather than regular gasoline. Biodiesel fuel is made from plants or animals and reduces pollution and helps with sustainable engineering.

1. Sustainable Site and Location: One important element of building that is often overlooked is finding an appropriate location to build. Avoiding inappropriate sites such as farmland and locating the site near existing infrastructure, like roads, sewers, stormwater systems and transit, allows builders to lessen negative impact on a home's surroundings.
2. Water Conservation: Conserving water can be economically done by installing low-flow fixtures that often cost the same as less efficient models. Water can be saved in landscaping applications by choosing the proper plants.
3. Materials: Green materials include many different options. People commonly assume that "green" means recycled materials. Although that recycled materials represent one option, green materials also include reused materials, renewable materials like bamboo and cork, or materials local to one’s region. A green material does not have to cost more or be of lesser or higher quality. Most green products are comparable to their non-green counterparts.
4. Energy Conservation: Probably the most important part of building green is energy conservation. By implementing passive design, structural insulated panels (SIPs), efficient lighting, and renewable energy like solar energy and geothermal energy, a home can benefit from reduced energy consumption or qualify as a net zero energy home.
5. Indoor Environmental Quality: The quality of the indoor environment plays a pivotal role in a person's health. In many cases, a much healthier environment can be created through avoiding hazardous materials found in paint, carpet, and other finishes. It is also important to have proper ventilation and ample day lighting.

=== Savings ===
1. Water Conservation: A newly constructed home can implement products with the WaterSense label at no additional costs and achieve a water savings of 20% when including the water heater savings and the water itself.
2. Energy Conservation: Energy conservation is highly intensive when it comes to cost premiums for implementation. However, it also has large potential for savings. Minimum savings can be achieved at no additional cost by pursuing passive design strategies. The next step up from passive design in the level of green (and ultimately the level of savings) would be implementing advanced building envelopematerials, like structural insulated panels (SIPs). SIPs can be installed for approximately $2 per linear foot of exterior wall. That equals a total premium of less than $500 for a typical one-story home, which will bring an energy savings of 50%. According to the DOE, the average annual energy expense for a single family home is $2,200. So SIPs can save up to $1,100 per year. To reach the savings associated with a net-zero energy home, renewable energy would have to be implemented on top of the other features. A geothermal energy system could achieve this goal with a cost premium of approximately $7 per square foot, while a photovoltaic system (solar) would require up to a $25,000 total premium.

== See also ==
- Civil engineering
- Ecotechnology
- Environmental engineering
- Environmental engineering science
- Environmental technology
- Green building
- Green engineering
- Sustainability
- Sustainable design
