= List of Greek and Latin roots in English/G =

All Latin and Greek roots beginning with G

Lists of Greek and Latin roots in English beginning with other letters:
- A
- B
- C
- D
- E
- F
- G
- H
- I
- J
- K
- L
- M
- N
- O
- P
- Q
- R
- S
- T
- U
- V
- X
- Z

== G ==
Root	Meaning in English	Origin language	Etymology (root origin)	English examples
galact- (ΓΛΑΚ)	milk	Greek	γάλα, γάλακτος (gála, gálaktos)	galactagogue, galactic, galactorrhea, lactose, polygala, polygalactia, galaxy
gam-	marriage, wedding	Greek	γάμος (gámos), γαμεῖν (gameîn), γαμέτης (gamétēs), γαμετή (gametḗ)	agamic, agamogenesis, agamospermy, agamy, allogamy, anisogamete, anisogamy, apogamy, autogamy, cleistogamous, cleistogamy, cryptogam, deuterogamist, deuterogamy, digamous, digamy, endogamous, endogamy, exogamous, exogamy, gamete, gametic, gametocyte, gametogenesis, gametophyte, geitonogamy, heterogametic, heterogamous, heterogamy, homogametic, karyogamy, misogamy, monogamous, monogamy, oogamy, planogamete, plasmogamy, polygamist, polygamy
gamb-	leg	Latin	gamba	gam, gambit, gambol, gammon
gamm-	G, g	Greek	Γ, γ, γάμμα (gámma)	gamma
gar- (GAR)	chatter	Latin	garrire	gargantuan, gargle, gargoyle, garrulous, jargon
gargal-	tickle	Greek	γαργαλίζειν (gargalízein), γαργαλιζόμενον (gargalizómenon), γαργαλισμός (gargalismós)	gargalesis, gargalesthesia, hypergargalesthesia
gargar-	gargle	Greek	γαργαρίζειν (gargarízein), γαργαρισμός (gargarismós), γαργαρεών	gargarize
gastr-	stomach	Greek	γαστήρ, γαστρός (gastḗr, gastrós)	epigastric, epigastrium, gasteroid, gastric, gastrin, gastritis, gastroenterologist, gastroenterology, gastrolith, gastronomic, gastronomy, gastroparesis, gastropod, gastroptosis, gastroschisis, gastrotrich, mesogastric, Myxogastria
ge-, geo-	earth	Greek	γῆ (gê), γαῖα, γαίας (gaîa, gaías), γεω- (geō-)	apogee, biogeography, epigeous, Gaia, geocentric, geocentrism, geode, geodesy, geodetic, geography, geoid, geology, geomancy, geometry, geomorphology, geophysicist, geophysics, georgic, Georgics, geosphere, geostatic, geostrophic, geosynchronous, geosyncline, hypogeous, hypogeum, Pangea, perigee
geiton-	neighbor	Greek	γείτων, γείτονος (geítōn, geítonos), γειτόνημα	geitonogamy
gel-	icy cold	Latin	gelum	congeal, congelation, gel, gelati, gelatin, gelatinous, gelation, gelato, gelée, gelid, gelifluction, gelignite, jellification, jelly
gen-, gon- (ΓΕΝ)	birth, beget, race, kind	Greek	γίγνεσθαι (gígnesthai), and related γένος (génos), γενετικός (genetikós), γένεσις (génesis); see also γενεά (geneá)	allergen, anagenesis, antigen, autogenesis, autogenous, biogenesis, dysgenic, endogen, endogenous, epigene, epigenesis, epigenetics, epigone, erogenous, Eugene, eugenic, eugenics, exogenous, gametogenesis, gene, genealogy, genesis, genetic, genocide, genotype, genophobia, gonad, heterogeneous, homogenesis, homogenetic, homogeneous, hydrogen, hypogene, hypogenesis, hypogenic, hypogenous, monogenic, oogenesis, paragenesis, pathogen, polygenous, progenesis, pseudogene, spermatogenesis
gen- (GEN)	beget	Latin	gignere, genitus, genus (genitive generis), see also generare	congenial, engender, gender, generate, generation, genial, genius, genital, genitive, genteel, gentle, genuine, genus, indigenous, ingenious, ingenuous, primogenitor, progeny
gephyr-	bridge	Greek	γέφυρα (géphura), γεφυρόω	gephyrophobia
ger-	old	Greek	γέρων, γέροντος (gérōn, gérontos) "old man", γηράσκω "grow old"	erigeron, gerascophobia, geriatric, geriatrics, gerontocracy, gerontology, gerontophile, gerontophilia, gerontophobia, gerontoplast, gerousia, progeria, progeroid
ger-, gest- (GES)	bear, carry	Latin	gerere, gestus	agger, congest, digest, gerundive, gestation, register, suggest, vicegerent
geran-	crane	Greek	γέρανος (géranos), γεράνιον (geránion), γερανώδης	Geranium
germ-	sprout	Latin	germen, germinis	germ, German, germane, germicide, germinal, germinate, germination, nongermane, regerminate
geu- (ΓΕΥΣ)	taste	Greek	γεύειν (geúein), γεύεσθαι (geúesthai), γεῦσις, γευόμενον	ageusia, dysgeusia, hypergeusia, hypogeusia, parageusia
glabr-	hairless	Latin	glaber	glabella, glabellar, glabrate, glabrescent, glabrous
glaci-	ice	Latin	glacies	glacé, glacial, glaciation, glacier, glacious, glacis, glance
gladi-	sword	Latin	gladius	gladiator, gladiolus
glauc-	gray	Greek	γλαυκός (glaukós), γλαυκότης, γλαύξ, γλαῦκος	glaucophane, Glaucopsyche, glaucophobia
glia-	glue	Greek	γλία (glía)	glial, glioblastoma, glioma, gliosis, microglia, neuroglia
glob-	sphere	Latin	globus	global, globate, globe, globose, globosity, globular, globule, globulin, inglobate
glori-	glory	Latin	gloria	gloriation, glorification, glorify, gloriole, glorious, glory, inglorious, vainglorious, vainglory
gloss-, glot-	tongue	Greek	γλῶσσα (glôssa), γλωττίς (glōttís)	aglossia, anthropoglot, aryepiglottic, diglossia, epiglottis, gloss, glossary, glossophobia, glottis, heterogloss, heteroglossia, idioglossia, isogloss, monoglot, monoglottism, polyglot, polyglottism
glut-	rump	Greek	γλουτός (gloutós)	gluteus
glutin-	glue	Latin	gluten, glutinis	agglutinant, agglutinate, agglutination, agglutinative, glue, glutelin, gluten, glutinosity, glutinous, nonagglutinative
glyc-	sweet	Greek	γλυκύς (glukús)	glycogen, glycogenesis, glycogenolysis, glycolipid, glycophyte, glycoprotein, glycoside, glycosidic, hypoglycaemia
glyph-	carve	Greek	γλύφειν (glúphein), γλυφή (gluphḗ), γλυπτός (gluptós), γλυπτικός (gluptikós)	aglyphous, anaglyph, ditriglyph, ditriglyphic, glyph, glyptic, Glyptodon, glyptograph, hieroglyph, hieroglyphic, monotriglyph, opisthoglyphous, petroglyph, proteroglyphous, solenoglyphous
gnath-	jaw	Greek	γνάθος (gnáthos), γναθμός	Agnatha, agnathous, chilognath, compsognathus, endognathion, epignathous, exognathion, gnathic, gnathophyma, hypognathous, hystricognath, mesognathion, mesognathous, prognathism
gno- (ΓΝΩ)	know	Greek	γιγνώσκειν (gignṓskein), γνῶναι, γνωτός (gnônai, gnōtós), γνωστός (gnōstós), γνωστικός (gnōstikós), γνῶσις (gnôsis), γνῶσμα, γνώμη (gnôsma, gnṓmē), γνώμων (gnṓmōn)	agnosia, agnostic, agnosticism, anagnorisis, diagnosis, dysanagnosia, gnomic, gnomon, gnomonic, gnosia, gnosis, Gnostic, gnosticism, pathognomonic, physiognomy, prognosis, telegnosis
gnosc-, -gnit-	know	Latin	gnoscere	acquaint, acquaintance, agnition, agnize, cognition, cognitional, cognitive, cognitivity, cognizable, cognizance, cognizant, cognize, cognoscence, cognoscenti, cognoscible, cognovit, connoisseur, ennoble, ennoblement, ignoble, ignorant, ignoscible, incognito, nobiliary, nobilitate, nobilitation, nobility, noble, note, notice, noticeable, notion, notional, notionality, notoriety, notorious, precognition, quaint, reacquaint, recognition, recognize, reconnaissance, reconnoiter, reconnoitre
gon-	corner, angle, knee	Greek	γωνία (gōnía), γόνυ (gónu)	goniometer, gonion, gonioscope, gonitis, gonyaulax, gonycampsis, hexagon, pentagon, polygon, trigon, trigonometry
grad-, gred-, gress- (GRAD)	walk, step, go	Latin	gradi, gressus "to step", from gradus "step"	aggradation, aggression, antegrade, anterograde, centigrade, degrade, degree, egress, gradation, grade, gradient, gradine, gradual, graduality, graduate, graduation, gree, ingress, multigrade, nongraduate, postgraduate, progradation, prograde, progress, regress, retrogradation, retrograde, saltigrade, tardigrade, transgress
gramm-	letter, writing	Greek	γράφειν (gráphein), γράμμα, γράμματος (grámma, grámmatos), γραμματικός (grammatikós)	anagram, anagrammatic, diagram, diagrammatic, engram, epigram, epigrammatic, grammar, grammatic, grammaticist, hologram, lipogram, monogram, pangrammatic, pentagram, program, programmatic, telegram, telegramme, tetragram, tetragrammaton, trigram
gran-	grain	Latin	grānum	degranulation, engrain, filigree, garner, garnet, grain, granary, grange, granger, granite, granivore, granivorous, granivory, granola, granular, granularity, granulate, granulation, granule, grenade, grogram, grosgrain, ingrain, multigrain, pomegranate
grand-	grand	Latin	grandis	aggrandisement, grandee, grandeur, grandific, grandiloquent, grandiloquous, grandiose, grandiosity, grandioso, grandity
graph-	draw, write	Greek	γράφειν (gráphein), γραφικός (graphikós), γραφή (graphḗ), γραφία (graphía), γραφεῖον (grapheîon)	allograft, anepigraphic, autograft, autograph, digraph, epigraphic, epigraphy, graft, graph, grapheme, graphemics, graphene, graphic, graphite, graphology, graphomania, graphospasm, heterograph, hexagraph, holography, homograph, isograft, logographic, micrograph, monograph, orthography, paragraph, photograph, photographic, photomicrograph, polygraph, pseudepigraphy, syngraft, telegraph, telegraphy, tetragraph, trigraph
grat-	thank, please	Latin	grātus, see also gratia	aggrace, agree, agreeable, agreeance, agreement, congratulant, congratulate, congratulatory, congree, disagree, disagreeable, disagreement, disgrace, grace, graciosity, gracioso, gracious, gratification, gratify, gratis, gratitude, gratuitous, gratuity, gratulant, gratulate, gratulation, gratulatory, grazioso, gree, ingrate, ingratiate, ingratiation, ingratitude, maugre, noncongratulatory, nongratuitous
grav-	heavy	Latin	gravis	aggravate, aggravation, aggravative, aggravator, aggrieve, aggrievement, degravation, gravamen, grave, gravid, gravida, gravidity, gravitas, gravitate, gravitation, gravitational, gravity, grief, grieve, grievance, grievant, grievous, ingravescence, ingravescent, multigravida, multigravidity, nongravitational, nulligravida, primigravida, reaggravate, supergravity
greg-	flock, herd	Latin	grex, gregis	aggregate, aggregation, aggregator, congregant, congregate, congregation, congregational, desegregate, desegregation, disaggregate, disgregate, disgregation, egregious, gregarian, gregarine, gregarious, intercongregational, segregate, segregation
gryp-	hooked	Greek	γρυπός (grupós), γρυπότης, γρύπωσις (grupótēs, grúpōsis)	arthrogryposis, Grypoceras, Gryposaurus
gubern-, gov-	govern, pilot	Latin	gubernare	governor, government, govern, gubernatorial,
gust-	taste	Latin	gustus	disgust, gustatory, gusto, gustoso
gutt-	drop	Latin	gutta	gout, gutta, guttate, guttifer, guttiform
guttur-	throat	Latin	guttur	goitre, guttural
gymn-	nude	Greek	γυμνός (gumnós)	gymnasium, gymnast, gymnastics, gymnophobia, gymnoplast, gymnosophist, gymnosperm, gymnospore
gyn-, gynaec-	woman	Greek	γυνή, γυναικός, (gunḗ, gunaikós)	acrogynous, androgyne, androgynous, androgyny, epigyne, epigynous, epigynum, gymnogynous, gynaeceum, gynaecocracy, gynarchy, gyne, gynecocracy, gynecology, gynecomastia, gynodioecious, gynoecium, gynoid, gynophobia, heterogynous, hypogynous, misogynist, monogyny, oligogyny, philogyny, polygynist, polygyny
gyr-	ring	Greek	γῦρος (gûros), γυρός (gurós)	agyria, autogyro, gyre, gyrectomy, gyrencephalic, gyrodyne, gyroid, gyromagnetic, gyromancy, gyroscope, gyrosphere, gyrostat, gyrostatic gyrotropic, gyrus, microgyrus, micropolygyria, pachygyria, polygyria, polymicrogyria, ulegyria
gyrin-	tadpole	Greek	γυρός, γυρῖνος (gurós, gurînos), γυρινώδης (gurinṓdēs)	Gyrinophilus
