= Neuronal migration disorder =

Developmental disorders due to disruption in the migration of neuroblasts

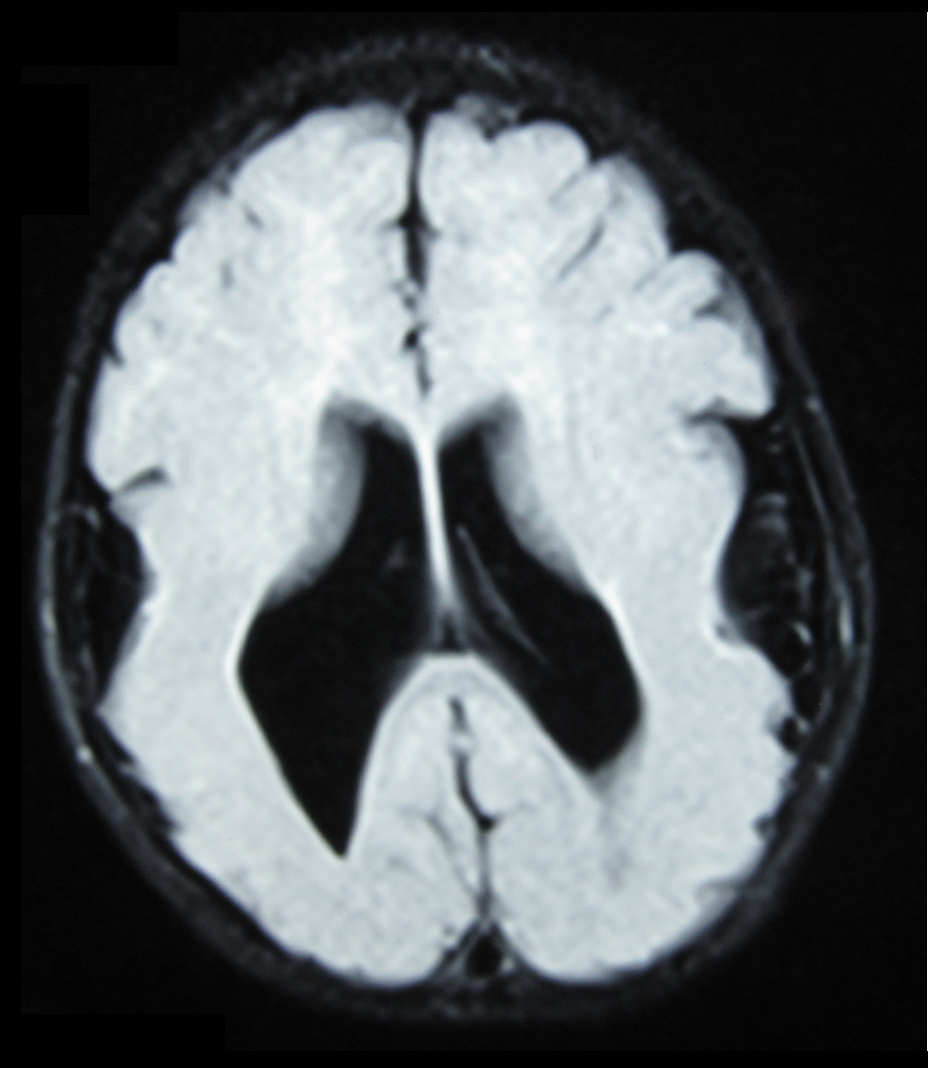
- Brain MRI, T1 weighted on a transversal plane, of an 8-month old boy with lissencephaly. Note the scarce and wide gyri, mostly on the parietal, temporal and occipital lobes, the absence of a true Sylvian fissure, and the augmented thickness of the gray matter. The boy had a severe developmental delay and seizures.
- Specialty: Neurology

Neuronal migration disorder (NMD) refers to a heterogenous group of disorders that, it is supposed, share the same etiopathological mechanism: a variable degree of disruption in the migration of neuroblasts during neurogenesis. The neuronal migration disorders are termed cerebral dysgenesis disorders, brain malformations caused by primary alterations during neurogenesis; on the other hand, brain malformations are highly diverse and refer to any insult to the brain during its formation and maturation due to intrinsic or extrinsic causes that ultimately will alter the normal brain anatomy. However, there is some controversy in the terminology because virtually any malformation will involve neuroblast migration, either primarily or secondarily.

== Symptoms and signs ==
Symptoms vary according to the abnormality, but often feature poor muscle tone and motor function, seizures, developmental delays, intellectual disabilities, failure to grow and thrive, difficulties with feeding, swelling in the extremities, and a smaller than normal head. Most infants with an NMD appear normal, but some disorders have characteristic facial or skull features that can be recognized by a neurologist.

== Cause ==
In the developing brain, neural stem cells must migrate from the areas where they are born to the areas where they will settle into their proper neural circuits. Neuronal migration, which occurs as early as the second month of gestation, is controlled by a complex assortment of chemical guides and signals. When these signals are absent or incorrect, neurons do not end up where they belong. This can result in structurally abnormal or missing areas of the brain in the cerebral hemispheres, cerebellum, brainstem, or hippocampus.

Several genetic abnormalities in children with NMDs have been identified. Defects in genes that are involved in neuronal migration have been associated with NMDs, but the role they play in the development of these disorders is not yet well understood.

A study in Sweden investigated the impact of environmental factors on NMDs. The study indicated that there might be an impact of low or subnormal maternal BMI before and during pregnancy, maternal infection, such as rubella, and maternal smoking on fetal brain development, including neuronal migration. The roles of maternal BMI and congenital infections should be tested in future analytical studies.

NMDs occur in the instance that 1) neuroblasts do not migrate from all of the ventricles or migrate only part of the way, 2) only some of the neuroblasts reach the cortical layer, 3) neuroblasts overshoot the appropriate cortical layer and protrude into the subarachnoid space, or 4) the late stage organization of the neuronal layer in the cortex is disrupted. Abnormal migration ultimately results in abnormal gyral formation.

== Diagnosis ==
=== Types of NMD syndromes ===
More than 25 syndromes resulting from abnormal neuronal migration have been described. Among them are syndromes with several different patterns of inheritance; genetic counseling thus differs greatly between syndromes.

- Lissencephaly
- Microlissencephaly
- Schizencephaly
- Porencephaly
- Pachygyria
- Polymicrogyria
- Agyria
- Macrogyria
- Microgyria
- Micropolygyria
- Grey matter heterotopia
- Agenesis of the corpus callosum
- Agenesis of the cranial nerves
- Band heterotopias

Focal cortical dysplasia, Miller–Dieker syndrome, muscle-brain-eye syndrome, Fukuyama congenital muscular dystrophy and Walker–Warburg syndrome are genetic disorders associated with lissencephaly.

== Treatment ==
Treatment is symptomatic and may include anti-seizure medication and special or supplemental education consisting of physical, occupational and speech therapies.

== Prognosis ==
The prognosis for children with NMDs varies depending on the specific disorder and the degree of brain abnormality and subsequent neurological signs and symptoms.
