= Central nervous system disease =

Disease of the brain or spinal cord

- Central nervous system in yellow (brain and spinal cord)
- Specialty: Psychiatry, Neurology, Neurosurgery

Central nervous system diseases or central nervous system disorders are a group of neurological disorders that affect the structure or function of the brain or spinal cord, which collectively form the central nervous system (CNS). These disorders may be caused by such things as infection, injury, blood clots, age related degeneration, cancer, autoimmune disfunction, and birth defects. The symptoms vary widely, as do the treatments.

Some disorders, such as substance addiction, autism, and ADHD may be regarded as CNS disorders, though the classifications are not without dispute.

== Signs and symptoms ==
Every disease has different signs and symptoms. Some of them are persistent headache; pain in the face, back, arms, or legs; an inability to concentrate; loss of feeling; memory loss; loss of muscle strength; tremors; seizures; increased reflexes, spasticity, tics; paralysis; and slurred speech. One should seek medical attention if affected by these.

== Causes ==
=== Trauma ===
Any type of traumatic brain injury (TBI) or injury done to the spinal cord can result in a wide spectrum of disabilities in a person. Depending on the section of the brain or spinal cord that experiences the trauma, the outcome may be anticipated.

=== Infections ===
Infectious diseases are transmitted in several ways. Some of these infections may affect the brain or spinal cord directly. Generally, an infection is a disease that is caused by the invasion of a microorganism or virus. Bacterial organisms are most often the cause, but animal parasites and fungi can also cause the infection.

=== Degeneration ===
Degenerative spinal disorders involve a loss of function in the spine. Pressure on the spinal cord and nerves may be associated with herniation or disc displacement. Degenerative spinal disorders can be primarily caused by the natural aging process and wear and tear of the spine over time. However, other factors can accelerate or contribute to these conditions, such as injury, repetitive strain, genetics, and tumors. Brain degeneration also causes central nervous system diseases (i.e. Alzheimer's, Lewy body dementia, Parkinson's, and Huntington's diseases). Raji et al 2010 reported correlation between obesity and brain degeneration and tissue loss.

=== Structural defects ===
Common structural defects include birth defects, anencephaly, and spina bifida. Children born with structural defects may have malformed limbs, heart problems, and facial abnormalities.

Defects in the formation of the cerebral cortex include microgyria, polymicrogyria, bilateral frontoparietal polymicrogyria, and pachygyria.

=== CNS Tumors ===
A tumor is an abnormal growth of body tissue. In the beginning, tumors can be noncancerous, but if they become malignant, they are cancerous. In general, they appear when there is a problem with cellular division. The exact causes of most central nervous system (CNS) tumors, including brain and spinal cord tumors, are still largely unknown. Over 90% of tumors arise sporadically with no apparent cause. However, some environmental and genetic factors are associated with an increased risk. Ionizing radiation is the only well-established environmental risk factor, accounting for only a few percent of incident CNS tumors. A few percent of CNS tumor cases are owing to specific inherited syndromes. Nonionizing radiation, pesticides, occupational exposures, infection, prior head trauma, and diet are other factors of CNS tumors under investigation. Problems with the body's immune system can lead to tumors.

=== Autoimmune disorders ===
An autoimmune disorder is a condition where in the immune system attacks and destroys healthy body tissue. This is caused by a loss of tolerance to proteins in the body, resulting in immune cells recognising these as 'foreign' and directing an immune response against them. However, the scientific community is still exploring answers to exactly what causes over 80 autoimmune diseases. Certain risk factors are believed to impact immune tolerance and may lead to the development of autoimmune conditions: sex, genetics, obesity, smoking, exposure to toxic agents, and infection.

=== Stroke ===
A stroke is an interruption of the blood supply to the brain. Approximately every 40 seconds, someone in the US has a stroke. This can happen when a blood vessel is blocked by a blood clot or when a blood vessel ruptures, causing blood to leak to the brain. If the brain cannot get enough oxygen and blood, brain cells can die, leading to permanent damage.

== Functions ==
=== Spinal cord ===
The spinal cord transmits sensory reception from the peripheral nervous system. It also conducts motor information to the body's skeletal muscles, cardiac muscles, smooth muscles, and glands. There are 31 pairs of spinal nerves along the spinal cord, all of which consist of both sensory and motor neurons. The spinal cord is protected by vertebrae and connects the peripheral nervous system to the brain, and it acts as a "minor" coordinating center.

=== Brain ===
The brain serves as the organic basis of cognition and exerts centralized control over the other organs of the body. The brain is protected by the skull; however, if the brain is damaged, significant impairments in cognition and physiological function or death may occur.

== Diagnosis ==
=== Types of CNS disorders ===
==== Addiction ====
Addiction is a disorder of the brain's reward system which arises through transcriptional and epigenetic mechanisms and occurs over time from chronically high levels of exposure to an addictive stimulus (e.g., morphine, cocaine, sexual intercourse, gambling, etc.).

==== Arachnoid cysts ====
Arachnoid cysts are cerebrospinal fluid covered by arachnoidal cells that may develop on the brain or spinal cord. They are a congenital disorder, and in some cases may not show symptoms. However, if there is a large cyst, symptoms may include headache, seizures, ataxia (lack of muscle control), hemiparesis, and several others. Macrocephaly and ADHD are common among children, while presenile dementia, hydrocephalus (an abnormality of the dynamics of the cerebrospinal fluid), and urinary incontinence are symptoms for elderly patients (65 and older).

==== Attention deficit/hyperactivity disorder (ADHD) ====
ADHD is an organic disorder of the nervous system. ADHD, which in severe cases can be debilitating, has symptoms thought to be caused by structural as well as biochemical imbalances in the brain; in particular, low levels of the neurotransmitters dopamine and norepinephrine, which are responsible for controlling and maintaining attention and movement. Many people with ADHD continue to have symptoms well into adulthood. Also of note is an increased risk of the development of Dementia with Lewy bodies, or (DLB), and a direct genetic association of Attention deficit disorder to Parkinson's disease two progressive, and serious, neurological diseases whose symptoms often occur in people over age 65.

==== Autism ====
Autism is a neurodevelopmental disorder that is characterized by repetitive patterns of behavior and persistent deficits in social interaction and communication.

==== Brain tumors ====
Tumors of the central nervous system constitute around 2% of all cancer in the United States.

==== Catalepsy ====
Catalepsy is a nervous disorder characterized by immobility and muscular rigidity, along with a decreased sensitivity to pain. Catalepsy is considered a symptom of serious diseases of the nervous system (e.g., Parkinson's disease, Epilepsy, etc.) rather than a disease by itself. Cataleptic fits can range in duration from several minutes to weeks. Catalepsy often responds to Benzodiazepines (e.g., Lorazepam) in pill and I.V. form.

==== Encephalitis ====
Encephalitis is an inflammation of the brain. It is usually caused by a foreign substance or a viral infection. Symptoms of this disease include headache, neck pain, drowsiness, nausea, and fever. If caused by the West Nile virus, it may be lethal to humans, as well as birds and horses.

==== Epilepsy and seizures ====
Epilepsy is an unpredictable, serious, and potentially fatal disorder of the nervous system, thought to be the result of faulty electrical activity in the brain. Epileptic seizures result from abnormal, excessive, or hypersynchronous neuronal activity in the brain. About 50 million people worldwide have epilepsy, and nearly 80% of epilepsy occurs in developing countries. Epilepsy becomes more common as people age. Onset of new cases occurs most frequently in infants and the elderly. Epileptic seizures may occur in recovering patients as a consequence of brain surgery.

==== Infection ====
A number of different pathogens (i.e., certain viruses, bacteria, protozoa, fungi, and prions) can cause infections that adversely affect the brain or spinal cord.

==== Meningitis ====
Meningitis is an inflammation of the meninges (membranes) of the brain and spinal cord. It is most often caused by a bacterial or viral infection. Fever, vomiting, and a stiff neck are all symptoms of meningitis.

==== Migraine ====
A chronic, often debilitating neurological disorder characterized by recurrent moderate to severe headaches, often in association with a number of autonomic nervous system symptoms.

==== Multiple sclerosis ====
Multiple sclerosis (MS) is a chronic, inflammatory demyelinating disease, meaning that the myelin sheath of neurons is damaged. Symptoms of MS include visual and sensation problems, muscle weakness, numbness and tingling all over, muscle spasms, poor coordination, and depression. Also, patients with MS have reported extreme fatigue and dizziness, tremors, and bladder leakage.

==== Myelopathy ====
Myelopathy is an injury to the spinal cord due to severe compression that may result from trauma, congenital stenosis, degenerative disease or disc herniation. The spinal cord is a group of nerves housed inside the spine that runs almost its entire length.

==== Tourette's ====
Tourette's syndrome is an inherited neurological disorder. Early onset may be during childhood, and it is characterized by physical and verbal tics. Tourette's often also includes symptoms of both OCD and ADHD indicating a link between the three disorders. The exact cause of Tourette's, other than genetic factors, is unknown.

=== Neurodegenerative disorders ===
==== Alzheimer's ====
Alzheimer's is a neurodegenerative disease typically found in people over the age of 65 years. Worldwide, approximately 24 million people have dementia; 60% of these cases are due to Alzheimer's. The ultimate cause is unknown. The clinical sign of Alzheimer's is progressive cognition deterioration.

==== Huntington's disease ====
Huntington's disease is a degenerative neurological disorder that is inherited. Degeneration of neuronal cells occurs throughout the brain, especially in the striatum. There is a progressive decline that results in abnormal movements. Statistics show that Huntington's disease may affect 10 per 100,000 people of Western European descent.

==== Lewy body dementia ====
Lewy body dementia is an umbrella term for two similar and common subtypes of dementia: dementia with Lewy bodies (DLB) and Parkinson's disease dementia (PDD). Both are characterized by changes in thinking, movement, behavior, and mood. The two conditions have similar features and may have similar causes, and are believed to belong on a spectrum of Lewy body disease that includes Parkinson's disease.

==== Parkinson's ====
Parkinson's disease, or PD, is a progressive illness of the nervous system. Caused by the death of dopamine-producing brain cells that affect motor skills and speech. Symptoms may include bradykinesia (slow physical movement), muscle rigidity, and tremors. Behavior, thinking, sensation disorders, and the sometimes co-morbid skin condition Seborrheic dermatitis are just some of PD's numerous nonmotor symptoms. Parkinson's disease, Attention deficit/hyperactivity disorder (ADHD) and Bi-polar disorder, all appear to have some connection to one another, as all three nervous system disorders involve lower than normal levels of the brain chemical dopamine (In ADHD, Parkinson's, and the depressive phase of Bi-polar disorder.) or too much dopamine (in Mania or Manic states of Bi-polar disorder) in different areas of the brain:

== Treatments ==
There are a wide range of treatments for central nervous system diseases. These can range from surgery to neural rehabilitation or prescribed medications. Neurotherapy, like many other treatments, relies on knowledge from traditional medicine and uses a scientific approach and evidence-based practice. Neurotherapy is a medical treatment that involves the targeted systemic administration of an energetic stimulus or chemical agent to a specific neurological area. However, some neuromodulation techniques are still considered alternative medicine (medical procedures that are not easily integrated into the mainstream healthcare model) due to their novelty and lack of supporting evidence. The wide range of non-invasive neurotherapy methods can be divided into four groups depending on the use of energy stimulation: acoustic energy, electric energy, electromagnetic radiation, and magnetic energy. The most valued pharmacological companies worldwide whose leading products are in CNS Care include CSPC Pharma (Hong Kong), Biogen (United States), UCB (Belgium) and Otsuka (Japan) who are active in treatment areas like MS, Alzheimers, Epilepsy and Psychiatry.

== See also ==
- Neurodegenerative disease
- List of central nervous system infections
