= Ruben Kuzniecky =

Panamanian-American neurologist

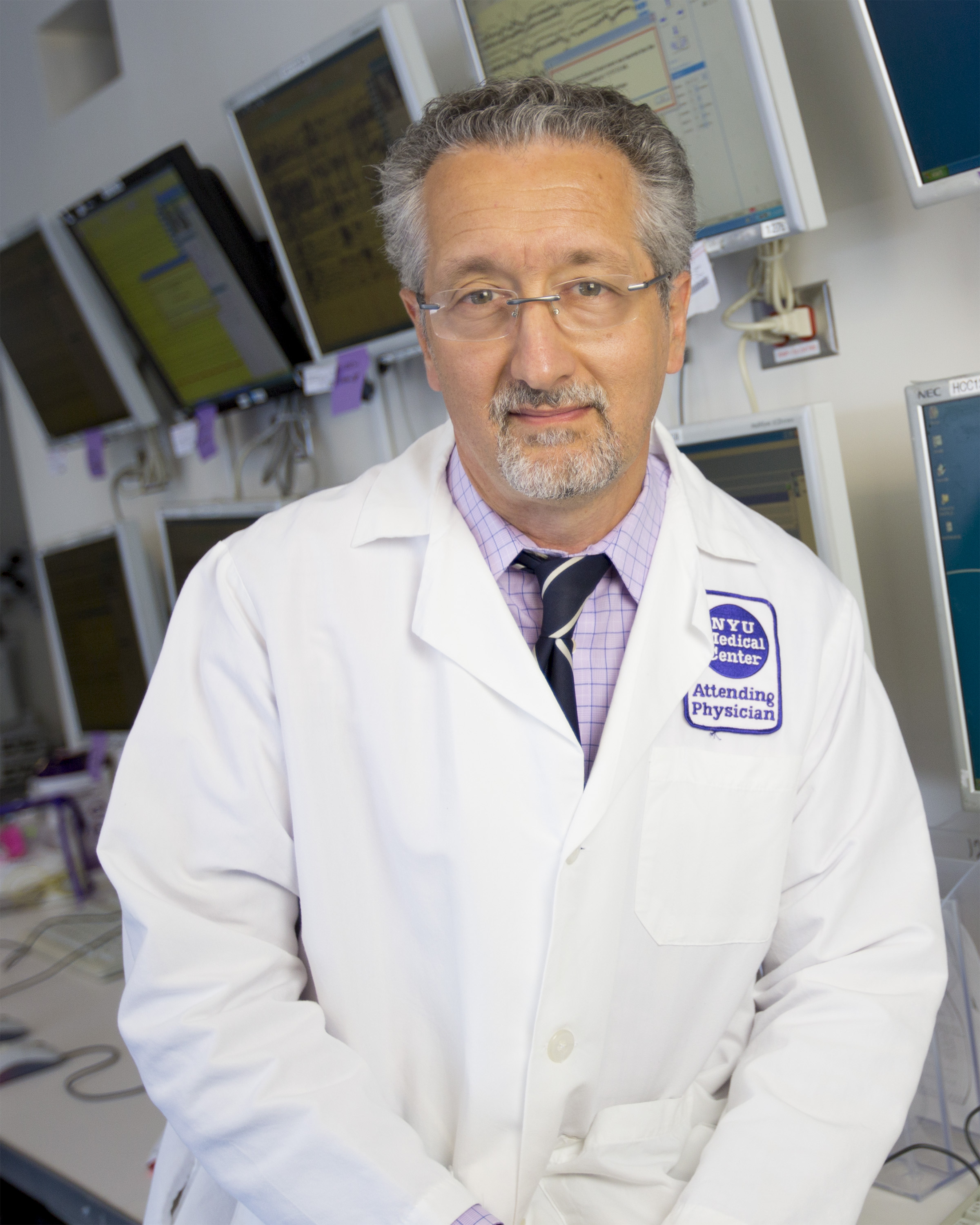
- Ruben Kuzniecky, 2009
- Born: August 18, 1957 (age 69); Panama City, Panama
- Education: University of Buenos Aires, Montreal Neurological Institute
- Relatives: Wife: Yvonne Kuzniecky (1983–present)
- Medical career
- Institutions: Vice Chair academic affairs and Director of Northwell Health Neurology Research, Professor of Neurology

Ruben Kuzniecky is a neurologist and scientist who is Vice-Chair of academic affairs and professor of neurology at Northwell Health, specializing in the field of epilepsy, epilepsy surgery and neuro-imaging.

He was one of the first to recognize and prove that mesial temporal sclerosis, a common cause for difficulty in controlling temporal lobe epilepsy, can be identified with MRI scans. He also described the Kuzniecky Syndrome in 1991, also known as perisylvian polymicrogyria. The syndrome is characterized by seizures, cognitive abnormalities, and a peculiar inability to use the mouth and tongue muscles. This syndrome is recognized by as a specific malformation of the brain.

== Early life ==
Kuzniecky was born in Panama City, Republic of Panama, the son of Betzalel and Sara Kuzniecky. His parents were educators and founded and directed schools in Panama, such as the Instituto Alberto Einstein and later on the Instituto Pedagogico. Kuzniecky attended the Instituto Pedagogico in Panama and graduated from the Instituto Wolfshon in Buenos Aires, Argentina. He excelled in high school as an athlete, finishing in 4th place in the 100 and 200 meter dash at the age of 16 in the Panama national school track and field championship. He entered the University of Buenos Aires medical school in 1975 and graduated in 1981.

== Career ==
After finishing medical school, Kuzniecky did a six-month stint as a research fellow at the Institute of Medical Research of the University of Buenos Aires. He then returned to Panama where he completed a one-year internship at the CSS Hospital in Panama City and then went into his second year of internship in the countryside. In 1983 he was accepted to the Montreal Neurological Institute and Hospital at McGill University for a neurology residency. He went into an epilepsy/EEG fellowship at the Montreal Neurological Institute under Drs. Pierre Gloor and Fred Andermann, which he completed in 1988. That year he was appointed as Assistant Professor of Neurology at the University of Alabama Birmingham, where he began his academic career. In 1992 he became Director of the UAB epilepsy center, a post he held until 2003. In 1997-1998 he was appointed as visiting professor at the Department of Physics at the University College London, where he did magnetic resonance imaging research.

In 1997, at the age of 40, he became full professor of Neurology and Neurosurgery at UAB and served as interim chair of the Department of Neurology in 2002. In 2003 he was appointed as Professor and Co-director of NYU Epilepsy Center at the NYU School of Medicine, New York and in August 2017 he was appointed as vice-chair, Academic affairs and director clinical research, Department of Neurology at Northwell Health. His research is centered on the use of Magnetic Resonance Imaging and its applications to epilepsy and on unraveling the major developmental brain malformations in epilepsy. He was the first to recognize and prove that mesial temporal sclerosis, a common cause for difficult epilepsy, can be identified with MRI.

In the area of brain malformations, he is the co-author of the widely recognized classification scheme. He has authored over 350 chapters and journal articles on a number of topics related to epilepsy. He has written two books on MRI applications in epilepsy, and more recently two patient-oriented books, Epilepsy 101:The Ultimate Guide for Patients and Families. and Epilepsy surgery: a guide for patients.

In 2007, Kuzniecky was co-awarded a major grant from the National Institutes of Health to organize the Epilepsy Phenome/Genome Project.

Kuzniecky described the Kuzniecky Syndrome in 1991, also known as perisylvian polymicrogyria. The syndrome is characterized by seizures, cognitive abnormalities, and a peculiar inability to use the mouth and tongue muscles. This syndrome is recognized by as a specific malformation of the brain.

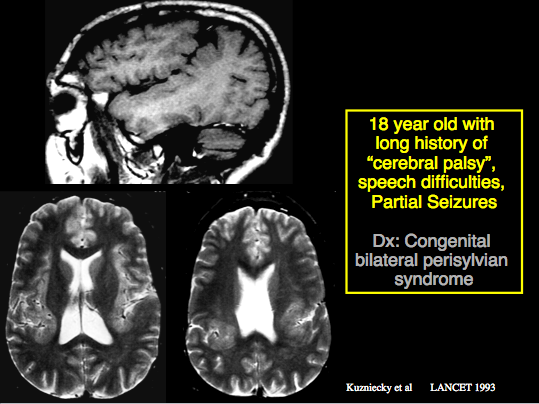
MRI showing the abnormal infolding of the perisylvian region typical of this syndrome. The abnormality is due to polymicrogyria.

Additional research projects include the development of a watch sensor to detect convulsive seizures. Kuzniecky continues to work on the Analysis of the Epilepsy Genome Phenome project through the EPi4K Genomic Discovery team. In addition, Kuzniecky, in conjunction with Dr. Daniel Lowenstein and Dr. Jacqueline A. French, launched the Human Epilepsy Project (HEP). This project, involving 30 sites, recruited 450 patients with new onset epilepsy and followed them up for seven years. The results of the study have been published in multiple journals including JAMA in 2025 showing that less patients become seizure free after developing epilepsy 2025;82;(10):1022-1030. doi:10.1001/jamaneurol.2025.2949 but in HEP II project, patients with intractable epilepsy tend to improve over time.

In the past years, Kuzniecky began a program to help adults and children from Panama with severe epilepsy to have access to surgical treatment by collaborating with Panama neurologists and bringing a US epilepsy team member to Panama's children's hospital. Since 2013, in conjunction with Dr. Howard L. Weiner from Texas Children's Hospital and others, the team has operated on over 100 children with severe epilepsy. The program has been supported by Panama's first lady office of social programs. In 2016 he founded the non-profit foundation LUCES PANAMA that provides free anti-seizure medications to children with epilepsy in Panama as well as other support. and more recently Dr Kuzniecky founded The Friends of LUCES foundation in the USA to support the work that LUCES Panama does.

He has been recognized for his efforts in the "Best Doctors in America" in 1995, 1998, and 2002–2017, and by The New Yorker since 2004 as one of the best doctors in the New York Metro area. In 2013, Kuzniecky was presented with the American Registry's 'Most Compassionate Doctor' Award. He has been listed among New York Magazine's Best Doctors and Castle Connolly America's Top Doctors for several consecutive years. In December 2020 Kuzniecky was awarded the 2020 American Epilepsy Society clinical science research award for his seminal contributions to the treatment of epilepsy.

Kuzniecky attends to patients with epilepsy and complex neurologic disorders at the Lenox Hill Hospital Northwell Health. He has been recognized as a leading expert in epilepsy, epilepsy surgery, epilepsy imaging and malformations of the brain and epilepsy and is widely respected in the medical community.

== Publications ==
- Kuzniecky, R; Jackson, G. (1995). Magnetic Resonance in Epilepsy. New York: Raven Press. ISBN 9780781702270. OCLC 30624999.
- Kuzniecky, R; Jackson, G. (2005). Magnetic Resonance in Epilepsy: Neuroimaging Techniques. Amsterdam: Elsevier. ISBN 9780124311527. OCLC 56642581.
- Kuzniecky, R (2009). Epilepsy 101: the ultimate guide for patients and families. New Jersey: Medicus Press. ISBN 9780978772734. OCLC 715620081.
- Epilepsy Surgery: A Guide for Patients and Families. Medicus Press. 12 August 2016.

== Patents ==
- Device for Seizure Detection (Patent No. US 0082019 A1)
- Microelectrode-Equipped Subdural Therapeutic Agent Delivery Strip (Patent No. US 8868176 B2)
- "METHOD, SYSTEM, AND COMPUTER-ACCESSIBLE MEDIUM FOR CLASSIFICATION OF AT LEAST ONE ICTAL STATE (US Patent 9,443,141)
- Minimally invasive subgaleal extra-cranial EEG monitoring device (Patent No. US 5012406203)

== Personal life ==
After his move to NYU, Kuzniecky took residency in New Jersey where he lives with his wife Yvonne. His three children and 8 grandchildren live in the US.
