= Gnathophyma =

- Specialty: Dermatology

Gnathophyma involves swelling of the chin. It is a type of lesion associated with rosacea, a common chronic inflammatory skin disorder of the sebaceous (oily and fatty) glands characterized by redness, swelling, and acne-like pustules.

Other lesions associated with rosacea, which affects about 10 percent of fair-skinned people normally between the ages of 30 and 50, include:

- Rhinophyma (enlarged nose)
- Metophyma (enlarged cushion-like swelling of the forehead)
- Blepharophyma (swelling of the eyelids)
- Otophyma (a cauliflower-like swelling of the earlobes)

Treatment for mild to moderate cases includes an oral antibiotic or topical gel or cream.

== See also ==
- List of cutaneous conditions
- Phymas in rosacea
