= He never married =

Euphemism for homosexuality of the deceased

"He never married" or "she never married" was a phrase used by British obituary writers as litotes for the deceased having been homosexual. Its use has been dated to the second half of the 20th century. As well as being used in queer coding, it is also used uncoded, where the subject never married but was not homosexual. A similar phrase is "confirmed bachelor".

== Usage ==
Obituaries conventionally concluded with a summary of the members of the immediate family of the deceased, typically the spouse (if surviving) and children. The phrase "He never married" became a staple euphemism of obituary writers used to imply that the subject was homosexual. Sex between men in England and Wales was illegal until 1967, so few men were openly gay. The ambiguity of the phrase has been commented on, however, by a number of sources. In 1999, James Fergusson, writing in Secrets of the Press about the coded language of obituaries, which he compared with the clues in a cryptic crossword, commented, "'He never married' closed an obituary with numbing finality" and asked "Did it, or did it not, mean that he was a hyperactive homosexual?"

In 2006, Nigel Rees dated its use to the second half of the 20th century, and noted that it was not only used without any implication of homosexuality, but that it also served the purpose of avoiding the use of the word "gay" for subjects who were open about their homosexuality but disliked that word. In 2007, Bridget Fowler's book The Obituary as Collective Memory noted that the phrase was sometimes used without a double meaning.

However, Rose Wild of The Times observed that even where it was used in an apparently non-coded form in historic obituaries, the phrase could still be revealing of the subject; Wild gave the example of a school master's obituary from 1923 that stated "he never married", but continued that he "usually spent his holidays in a little inn frequented by seafaring men at Falmouth". In 2017, Wild wrote in The Times that the use of "He never married" began to die out in the late 1980s, "but not before it had become absurd". She noted its "otiose" use in the paper's obituaries for Robert Mapplethorpe (died 1989) and Danny La Rue (died 2009).

In 2016, Christian Barker of The Rake observed, "Until quite recently, obituary writers had a habit of concluding with the euphemism 'He never married' to subtly indicate that the subject was gay"; Barker continued by connecting the phrase to misogamy (aversion to marriage) rather than homosexuality, and asserted that there were plenty of examples of "'confirmed bachelors' simply shrugging off the shackles of matrimony and choosing to remain single throughout their lives—experiencing no less success because of it".

== "Confirmed bachelor" ==
A similar phrase, "confirmed bachelor", was used in the second half of the 20th century by the satirical magazine Private Eye, as one of its many euphemisms and in-jokes. Rose Wild reported in May 2016, however, that she could only find around a dozen examples of "confirmed bachelor" in The Times obituaries, some of which were of a non-coded form, causing her to wonder whether the phrase existed much outside the imagination of the writers of Private Eye. In 2015, the term was used in a Washington Post headline to describe U.S. Senator Lindsey Graham.

== See also ==
- Bachelor, an unmarried man
- Invert, an outdated term referring to homosexuality
- Lavender marriage, a marriage of convenience between a man and a woman, undertaken to conceal the socially stigmatised sexual orientation of one or both partners.
- Queer erasure, a term that describes the exclusion of queer history from public history
- Same-sex marriage, a marriage between two people of the same sex
- Spinster, an unmarried woman, usually carrying pejorative connotations
- Hugh Massingberd, an obituary writer known for creative euphemism
