= Aristaless related homeobox =

Protein-coding gene in humans

ARX

Identifiers
- Aliases: ARX, CT121, EIEE1, ISSX, MRX29, MRX32, MRX33, MRX36, MRX38, MRX43, MRX54, MRX76, MRX87, MRXS1, PRTS, aristaless related homeobox
- External IDs: OMIM: 300382; MGI: 1097716; GeneCards: ARX

Gene location (Human)
Chr.	X chromosome (human)
Band	Xp21.3	Start	25,003,694 bp
Band	Xp21.3	End	25,016,420 bp

Gene location (Mouse)
Chr.	X chromosome (mouse)
Band	X C3|X 41.05 cM	Start	92,330,051 bp
Band	X C3|X 41.05 cM	End	92,341,963 bp
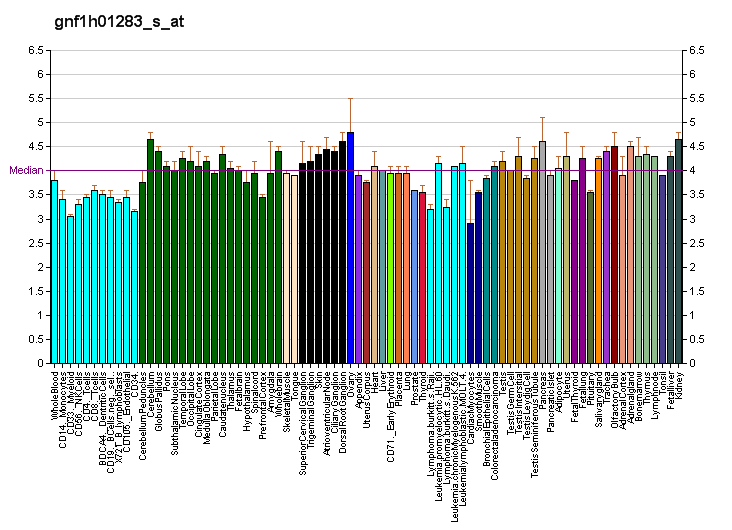

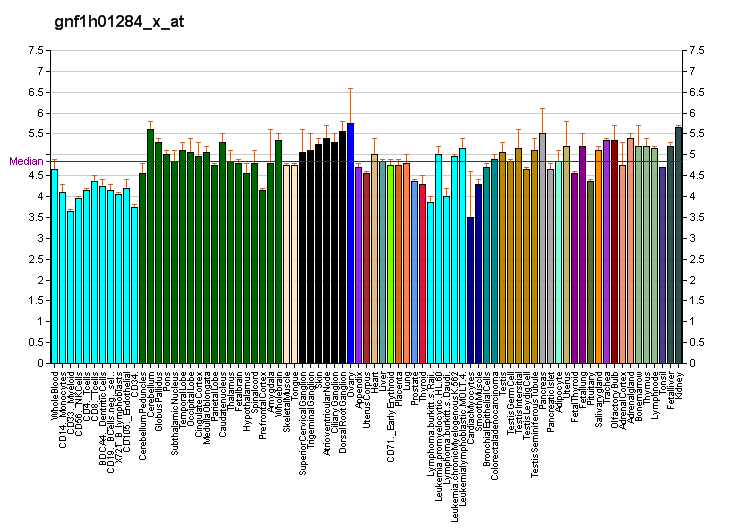
RNA expression pattern
Bgee	Human / Mouse (ortholog); Top expressed in: left ovary; right ovary; ventricular zone; vastus lateralis muscle; germinal epithelium; endothelial cell; bronchial epithelial cell; Brodmann area 23; biceps brachii; cingulate gyrus / Top expressed in: Rostral migratory stream; medial ganglionic eminence; Gonadal ridge; ventricular zone; olfactory bulb; fallopian tube; temporal muscle; nucleus accumbens; efferent ductule; ovary; More reference expression data
BioGPS	More reference expression data
Gene ontology
Molecular function	RNA polymerase II cis-regulatory region sequence-specific DNA binding; DNA binding; sequence-specific DNA binding; chromatin binding; DNA-binding transcription repressor activity, RNA polymerase II-specific; DNA-binding transcription factor activity, RNA polymerase II-specific; RNA polymerase II transcription regulatory region sequence-specific DNA binding
Cellular component	nucleus
Biological process	cell differentiation; regulation of transcription, DNA-templated; cerebral cortex tangential migration; lipid digestion; positive regulation of organ growth; neuron migration; negative regulation of transcription by RNA polymerase II; globus pallidus development; transcription, DNA-templated; nervous system development; axon guidance; multicellular organism development; positive regulation of gene expression; regulation of cell population proliferation; epithelial cell fate commitment; embryonic olfactory bulb interneuron precursor migration; cerebral cortex GABAergic interneuron migration; forebrain development; olfactory bulb development; cell proliferation in forebrain; neuron development
Sources:Amigo / QuickGO
Orthologs
Databases	NCBI: entry; OMA: entry
Species	Human	Mouse
Entrez	170302	11878
Ensembl	ENSG00000004848	ENSMUSG00000035277
UniProt	Q96QS3	O35085
RefSeq (mRNA)	NM_139058	NM_007492; NM_001305940
RefSeq (protein)	NP_620689	NP_001292869; NP_031518
Location (UCSC)	Chr X: 25 – 25.02 Mb	Chr X: 92.33 – 92.34 Mb
PubMed search
- Wikidata
View/Edit Human	View/Edit Mouse

Aristaless related homeobox is a protein that in humans is encoded by the ARX gene.

== Function ==
This gene is a homeobox-containing gene expressed during development. The expressed protein contains two conserved domains, a C-peptide (or aristaless domain) and the prd-like class homeobox domain. It is a member of the group-II aristaless-related protein family whose members are expressed primarily in the central and/or peripheral nervous system. This gene is involved in CNS and pancreas development.

== Clinical significance ==
Mutation in the ARX gene are associated with X-linked intellectual disability, lissencephaly, as well as hypoglycemia (in mice).

== See also ==
- homeobox
