= Ulegyria =

Type of cortical scarring deep in the sulci

Ulegyria is a diagnosis used to describe a specific type of cortical scarring in the deep regions of the sulcus that leads to distortion of the gyri. Ulegyria is identified by its characteristic "mushroom-shaped" gyri, in which scarring causes shrinkage and atrophy in the deep sulcal regions while the surface gyri are spared. This condition is most often caused by hypoxic-ischemic brain injury in the perinatal period. The effects of ulegyria can range in severity, although it is most commonly associated with cerebral palsy, intellectual disability and epilepsy. N.C. Bresler was the first to view ulegyria in 1899 and described this abnormal morphology in the brain as “mushroom-gyri." Although ulegyria was first identified in 1899, there is still limited information known or reported about the condition.

Gyrus vs. sulcus

== Anatomy ==
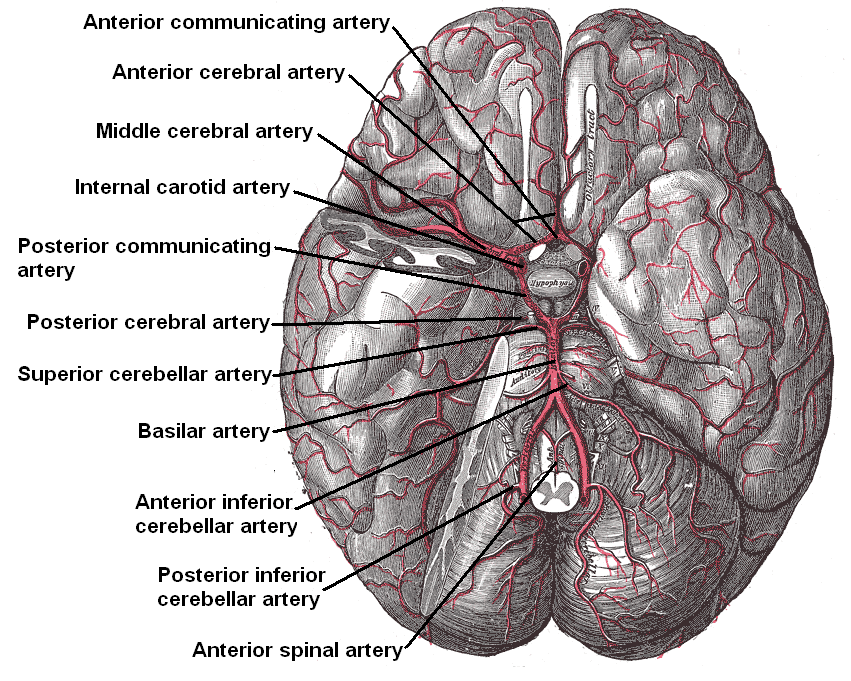
Arteries supplying the brain

The physical features of ulegyria consist of small radial scars which occupy the cortical sulci. Overall, the physical structure of affected areas in the brain is described as a “mushroom”-like shape in which the gyri are unusually large and the sulci become wider deeper in the cortex. N.C. Bresler, the first person to view a brain with ulegyria in 1899, coined the phrase mushroom gyri. He also named the disorder, basing it off the Latin root ule, meaning scar. This mushroom-like structure is the result of the lower parts of the ulegyria-affected area being more prone to deterioration, while the upper gyri are usually spared. However, the entire affected area shrinks and presents brown coloration as a result of ulegyria. In addition, “islands” of neurons that are relatively unaffected can exist between ulegyria affected neurons. Ulegyria can develop bilaterally or unilaterally, though the former is more commonly diagnosed.

Ulegyria can affect many parts of the brain including the cerebral cortex, parasagittal areas and posterior regions of the brain, such as the parietal and occipital lobes. These areas are situated either near artery rich regions or near a major cerebral artery. For instance, specifically in neonatal children, ulegyria-affected areas are found near the posterior cerebral artery or near the artery rich region between the middle and posterior regions of the brain, often referred to as watershed regions.

Neurons affected by ulegyria exhibit properties that differ from normally functioning neurons. For instance, ulegyria affected neurons experience gliosis in which glial cells, specifically astrocytes, build up near and around neurons. Ulegyria affected neurons also display decreases in their white matter content, showing signs of sclerosis, which is characterized by the deterioration of myelin in neurons. However, in regions of grey matter, large dense aggregates of myelin are present. Ulegyria affected neurons also display metabolic disorders which could be linked to the disease phenylketonuria and disruptions in the urea cycle. Hypoglycemia and hypoxia are also thought to accompany the symptoms of ulegyria-affected neurons as well.

== Causes ==
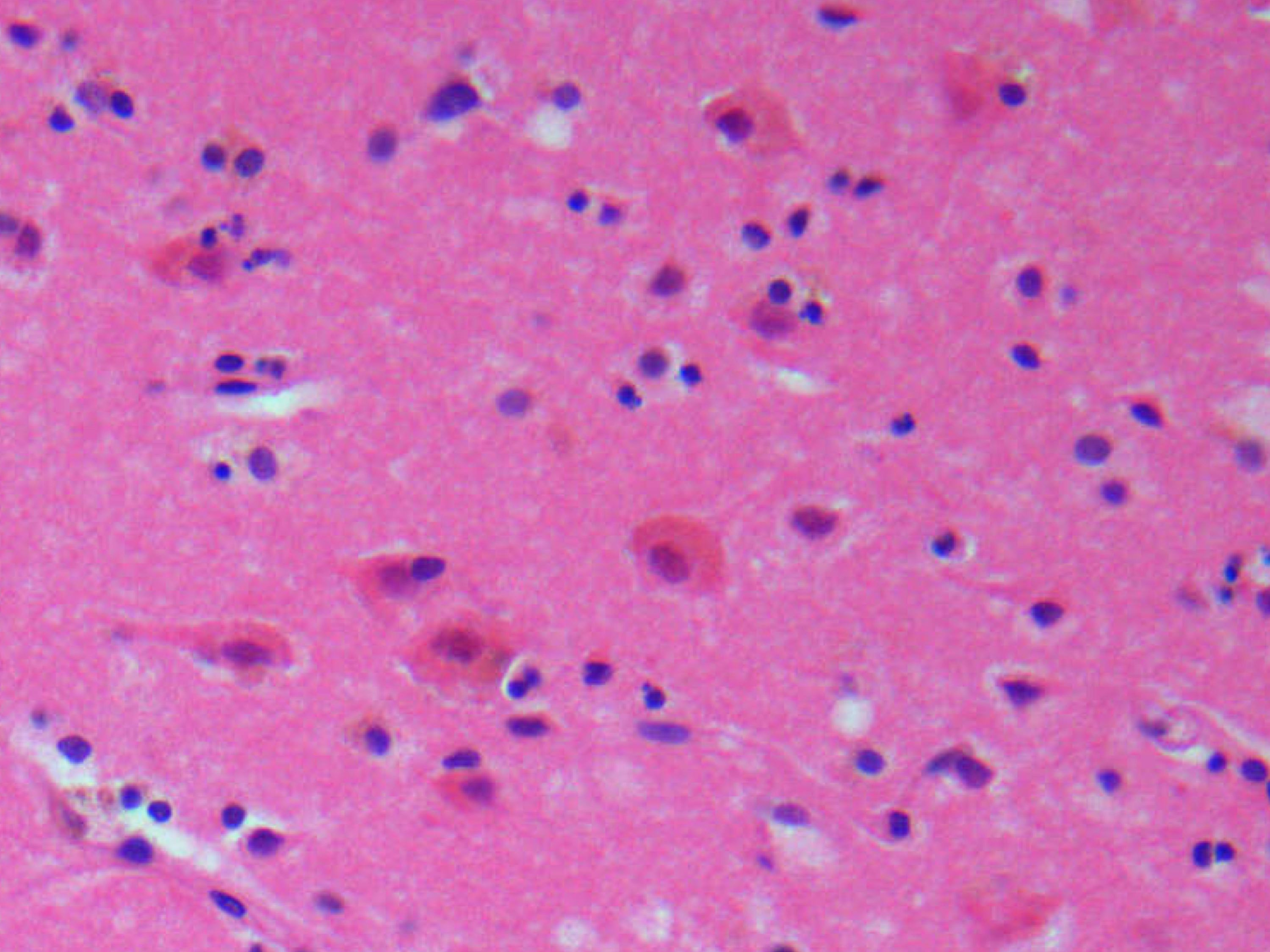
Microphotograph of HE stained section of human brain tissue upon acute ischemic stroke

Ulegyria develops as a result of a brain injury called cerebral ischemia surrounding the time of an infant's birth. Oftentimes, fetal hypoxic-ischemic brain injuries occur as a result of a pregnancy complications such as placental abruption, cord accident, or cardiovascular stress due to a difficult delivery. A lack of oxygen to the brain contributes to the formation of lesions usually near the three main cerebral arteries, located near the parietal lobe and occipital lobes of the brain. The cause of perinatal brain injuries includes:

1. cerebral ischemia
2. cerebral hemorrhage
3. ascending intrauterine infections.

Some risk factors for perinatal brain injuries include: low birth weight, preterm birth, poor perinatal cardiorespiratory fitness, and artificial ventilation.

=== Cerebral ischemia ===
Cerebral ischemia occurs when the brain is not receiving adequate oxygen to continue normal functions. When this occurs, the body makes restoring oxygenated blood flow to life-sustaining organs a priority. The brain alters the diameter of major blood vessels to redistribute blood to key organs such as the brain, heart, and adrenal glands. If sympathetic nervous system activation does not produce any improvement, oxygen levels will continue to fall and disruptions to metabolism, other cellular processes, and overall functioning will ensue.

Another serious result of inefficient blood flow is that cells do not receive adequate amounts of glucose. An immediate effect of low intracellular glucose is reduced ATP production in the cell. This effectively inactivates the Na-K pump, leading to the uptake of calcium ions by the cell. Continued influx of calcium serves to constitutively activate downstream effectors, including lipases, proteases, and endonucleases, whose actions eventually destroy the cell skeleton. Intracellular calcium concentrations are increased further due to the opening of glutamate-regulated ion channels. Ischemia causes anoxic cell depolarizations and it is this increase in membrane potential at the presynaptic cell that triggers the release of glutamate, an excitatory neurotransmitter.

Glucose deprivation in the brain for any amount of time has the potential to pose serious consequences, and the amount of time the brain spends under these anoxic conditions is directly related to accumulation of irreversible damage to protein biosynthesis pathways. Protein synthesis all over the body is severely inhibited and essentially comes to a standstill while the brain is suffering from acute oxygen deprivation. Once oxygen sufficiently saturates the tissues again, protein biosynthesis returns to normal in non-vulnerable areas but remains at below normal levels in other areas. Insufficient protein synthesis in the brain is especially troubling in the fetal brain given the amount of growth and development that normally occurs. Areas particularly vulnerable to the damaging effects of hypoxic episodes include: the superior brainstem, the cerebellum, white matter and subcortical structures supplied by the branches of deep and superficial penetrating blood vessels. Vulnerable areas where protein synthesis is interrupted usually indicate impending cell death in neurons. When oxygen levels return, oxygen radicals, nitric oxide and an imbalance of neurotransmitters cause further damage and lead to cellular death through apoptosis. Neuron cell death is responsible for gliosis and results in the mushroom appearance of areas and is characteristic of ulegyria.

=== Cerebral hemorrhage ===
A cerebral hemorrhage is the result of immature blood vessels of a brain lesion bursting. The germinal matrix is a part of the brain that normally disappears as the fetal brain develops but during this process it is not unusual for changes in vessel volume to cause a vessel to burst. According to recent microscopic studies, the most common location for a cerebral hemorrhage is where the medullary veins drain to the terminal vein in the sub-ependymal region. It has been hypothesized that because pre-term babies don't have fully developed sympathetic nervous systems, they cannot react as well to low oxygen saturation levels caused by the cerebral hemorrhage. Although babies born at full-term are still susceptible to this, they are likely to respond better and thus, tend to have better outcomes in response to low-oxygen events.

=== Ascending intrauterine infections ===
Recent research has found a connection between intrauterine infections and inflammation in the mother and an increased likelihood of perinatal brain damage in the fetus. This study suggested that intrauterine infections in the mother could affect glial cells and toll-like receptors (TLRs) which are important in moderating the inflammatory response in the fetal brain. When glial cells and TLRs are negatively affected they are not able to react to developing inflammation in the brain as well. The connection between ascending intrauterine infections and perinatal brain damage is a developing research theory but a more detailed explanation of the connection is not yet known.

== Signs and symptoms ==
Ulegyria was found in about 1/3 of patients with defects caused by circulatory disease in the perinatal period. Most clinical observations of the condition report intellectual disability, cerebral palsy, and seizures as the main defects. However, milder cases have been reported in which patients that exhibit ulegyria develop relatively normally. The main movement disorders associated with ulegyria that are classified as cerebral palsy are choreoathetosis, dystonia, and ataxia. It is suspected that ulegyria leads to epilepsy because malformation of the cortex obstructs the differentiation of neurons, glial cells, and synapses. Parietal-occipital lobe epilepsy, which is often synonymous with posterior cortex epilepsy (PCE), is the form of the disease seen in most cases involving ulegyria. This type of epilepsy is very rare, making up about 5% of all reports of epilepsy. This form of the disease involves symptoms that would be expected from damage to the parietal and occipital lobes: seizures with visual hallucinations, visuospatial dysfunction, tingling, numbness, pain, and a burning sensation. In addition to ulegyria, tumors and cortical dysplasia constitute the major causes of PCE. Most of the epilepsy seen in conjunction with ulegyria is classified as medically refractory, meaning it is not responsive to treatment. Patients usually present symptoms of epilepsy at an early age. The severity of epilepsy has been shown to depend on this age of onset as well as the quantity of cortical lesions; earlier onset of epilepsy and a larger extent of lesions tends to mean more severe seizures.

== Similar conditions ==
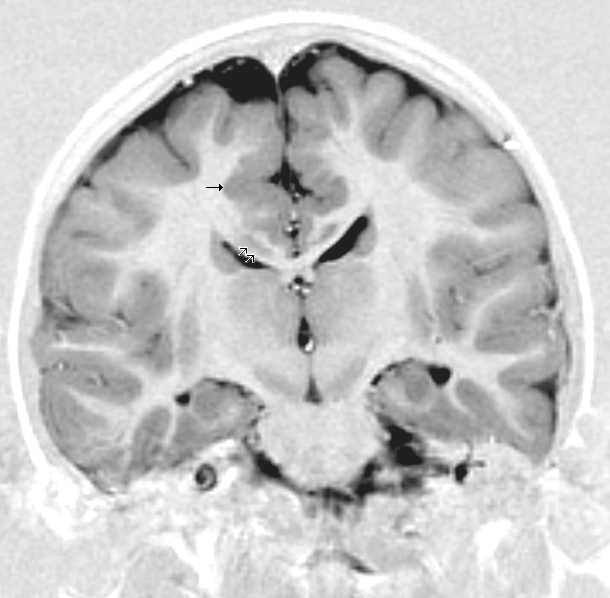
Child presenting with seizures likely due to polymicrogyria (seen at arrow).

Ulegyria is often confused with a similar distortion of the cortex known as polymicrogyria. Polymicrogyria is characterized by excessive folding of the surface gyri and a thickening of the cerebral cortex, rather than the sulcal scarring that is typical of ulegyria. In addition to morphological differences, the period in which polmicrogyria and ulegyria emerge is also different. Polymicrogyria typically forms while the embryo's central nervous system is maturing. Ulegyria is acquired later in development during the perinatal period after neuronal migration has already occurred. It is also suspected that polymicrogyra is genetically linked, whereas ulegyria is caused by environmental factors—namely lack of oxygen.

Polymicrogyria can lead to similar conditions that are linked to ulegyria such as intellectual disability, cerebral palsy, and epilepsy. It has been observed that patients with polymicrogyria are not receptive to epilepsy surgery. However, responses of patients with ulegyria to similar surgeries are still not fully known, which makes distinction of these two disorders significant. In vivo neuroimaging techniques, namely MRI, have been instrumental in making this distinction. An MRI image of ulegyria is identified by mushroom shaped gyri, deformities in white matter, and localization mainly in the posterior cerebral region. Polymicrogyria is typically recognized by a scalloped appearance at the bordering region between grey and white matter. Although these distinctions have been made with many patients, there is still some difficulty in defining distinct boundaries between these two similar conditions.

== Detection ==
Primarily, the main method of detecting ulegyria is through the use of MRI screening for epilepsy. Normally an MRI of an ulegyria affected region will reveal groups of deteriorated neurons with gliosis present. In addition, unaffected gyri are also present in especially bilateral watershed regions indicating delayed effects of perinatal hypoxic damage. However, there are three main criteria for diagnosing ulegyria using MRI in addition to the features mentioned above:

1.The presence of a poorly demarcated lesion
2. Atrophy and thinning of the cortex resulting in the characteristic “mushroom” like shape of ulegyria.
3. Presence of white matter signal abnormalities as a result of FLAIR signaling (fluid attenuated inversion recovery).

Another sign of ulegyria that is visible on an MRI scan is the presence of a widened subarachnoid space, signifying cortex atrophy. FLAIR signaling can help visualize the depths of the parietal-occipital sulci, which also allows ulegyria-affected gyri to be identified. Though there is still confusion in differentiating ulegyria and polymicrogyria in patients, MRI allows for the proper identification in the majority of the cases. In addition, most of the current research regarding ulegyria is focused on improving this identification. Furthermore, MRI can diagnose whether ulegyria presence is unilateral or bilateral. Electroencephalography, EEG, can also be used to screen for ulegyria, though MRI is still preferred. This is mainly done for epilepsy patients as abnormalities in EEG recordings indicate the presence of ulegyria in the area of the brain being tested. For example, when EEG tests in epileptic patients show deviations in the frontal and central-parietal regions, ulegyria can be considered to be present in that area.

== Treatment ==
Presently, there is no well-defined treatment for ulegyria mainly because of the irreversible ischaemic damage done to neurons of an affected area. However, conditions associated with ulegyria, such as epilepsy and cerebral palsy, can be treated using the appropriate treatment. For instance, seizures caused by epilepsy, due to the presence of ulegyria in the occipital lobe, can be controlled using antiepileptic drugs in some patients. In other patients, such as those who suffer from ulegyria in the posterior cortex, drugs are not effective and surgery of the area causing epilepsy is needed. These treatments treat only the conditions but have no effect on the condition of ulegyria itself.
