= CEP85L =

Identifiers
- Aliases: CEP85L, C6orf204, NY-BR-15, bA57K17.2, centrosomal protein 85 like, LIS10
- External IDs: MGI: 3642684; GeneCards: CEP85L

Gene location (Human)
Chr.	Chromosome 6 (human)
Band	6q22.31	Start	118,460,772 bp
Band	6q22.31	End	118,710,075 bp

Gene location (Mouse)
Chr.	Chromosome 10 (mouse)
Band	10 B3|10	Start	53,149,539 bp
Band	10 B3|10	End	53,256,043 bp
RNA expression pattern
Bgee	Human / Mouse (ortholog); Top expressed in: thymus; tibialis anterior muscle; pylorus; spinal ganglia; trigeminal ganglion; deltoid muscle; Skeletal muscle tissue of biceps brachii; myocardium of left ventricle; testicle; left testis / Top expressed in: spermatid; otolith organ; intercostal muscle; utricle; thoracic diaphragm; soleus muscle; temporal muscle; sternocleidomastoid muscle; muscle of thigh; triceps brachii muscle; More reference expression data
BioGPS	n/a
Orthologs
Databases	NCBI: entry; OMA: entry
Species	Human	Mouse
Entrez	387119	100038725
Ensembl	ENSG00000111860	ENSMUSG00000038594
UniProt	Q5SZL2	A0A1W2P884
RefSeq (mRNA)	NM_001042475; NM_001178035; NM_206921	NM_001204983
RefSeq (protein)	NP_001035940; NP_001171506; NP_996804	NP_001191912
Location (UCSC)	Chr 6: 118.46 – 118.71 Mb	Chr 10: 53.15 – 53.26 Mb
PubMed search
- Wikidata
View/Edit Human	View/Edit Mouse

Centrosomal protein of 85 kDa-like is a protein that in humans is encoded by the CEP85L gene. This protein has been identified as a breast cancer antigen. Nothing more is known of its function at this time. Three transcript variants encoding different isoforms have been found for this gene. It has been shown to be related to the QT interval in GWAS studies. This protein localizes in the centrosome.

== Pathology ==
Mutations of the CEP85L gene are associated with a type of posterior predominant lissencephaly called lissencephaly 10.
