= Otophyma =

Chronic swelling of ears

- Specialty: Dermatology

Otophyma is a cauliflower-like swelling of one or both ears.

== See also ==
- List of cutaneous conditions
- Phymas in rosacea
