= Metophyma =

Swellings on the forehead above the nose

- Specialty: Dermatology

Metophyma is cushion-like swellings on the forehead above the saddle of the nose.

== See also ==
- List of cutaneous conditions
- Phymas in rosacea
