= Blepharophyma =

Chronic swelling of eyelids

- Specialty: Dermatology

Blepharophyma is chronic swelling of eyelids, mainly due to sebaceous gland hyperplasia.

== See also ==
- List of cutaneous conditions
- Phymas in rosacea
