= Lissencephaly =

Birth defect in which the brain lacks surface folds

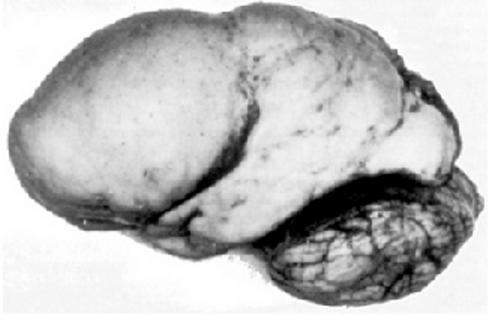
- Lissencephalic brain of a human, lacking surface convolutions (gyrification)
- Specialty: Medical genetics, neurology
- Causes: Absence of gyrification
- Treatment: See below
- Prognosis: Usually die young; see below for details

Lissencephaly (/ˌlɪs.ɛnˈsɛf.əl.i/, meaning 'smooth brain') is a set of rare brain disorders whereby the whole or parts of the surface of the brain are smooth. It is caused by defective neuronal migration during the 12th to 24th weeks of gestation, resulting in a lack of development of brain folds (gyri) and grooves (sulci). It is a form of cephalic disorder. Terms such as agyria (no gyri) and pachygyria (broad gyri) are used to describe the appearance of the surface of the brain.

Children with lissencephaly generally have significant developmental delays, but these vary greatly from child to child depending on the degree of brain malformation and seizure control. Life expectancy can be shortened, generally due to respiratory problems.

== Signs and symptoms ==
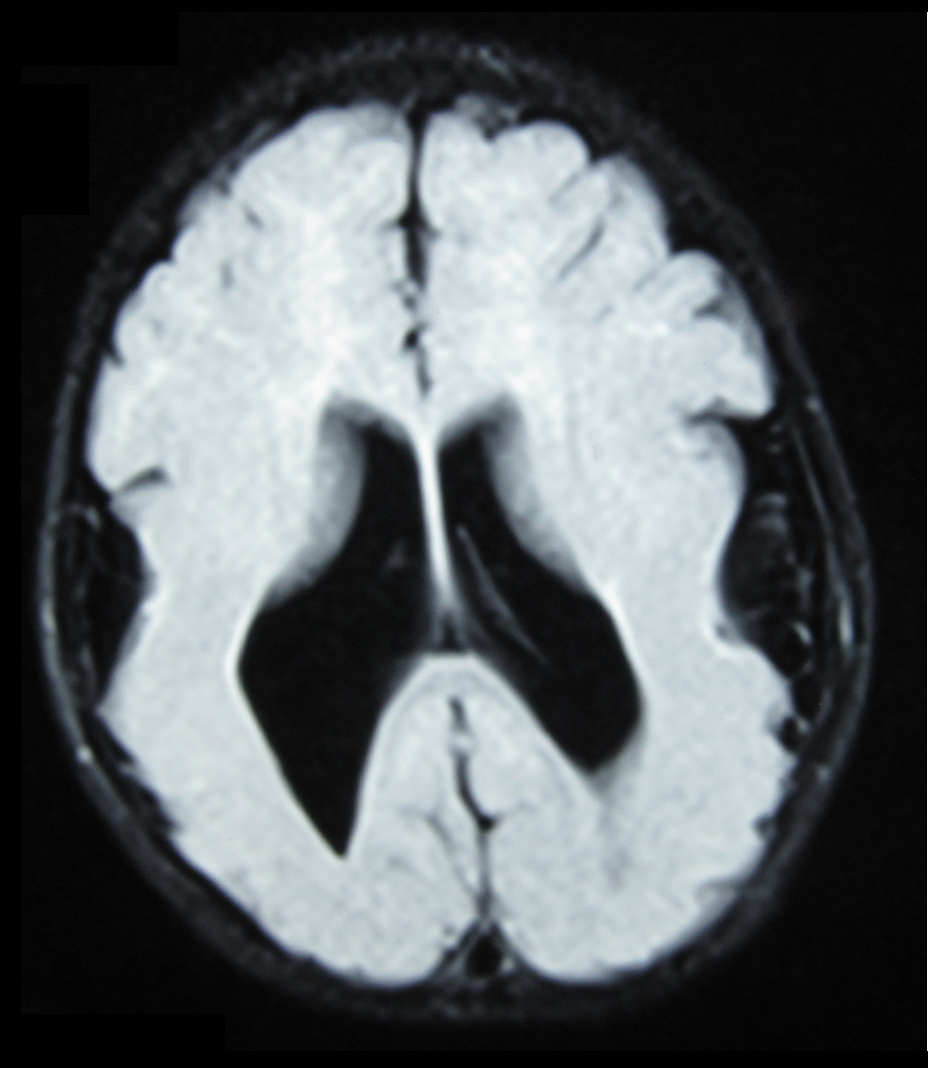
MRI scan showing the characteristic smooth brain of an individual with lissencephaly

Affected children display severe psychomotor impairment, failure to thrive, seizures, and muscle spasticity or hypotonia. Other symptoms of the disorder may include unusual facial appearance, difficulty swallowing, and anomalies of the hands, fingers, or toes.

Symptoms of lissencephaly are detected via ultrasound at about twenty-three weeks of gestation and require confirmation via prenatal MRI. It is characterized by absence or reduction of the sulci and gyri of the cerebral surface and a thickened cortex.

There are anatomical symptoms that differ across the two main types of lissencephaly, Classical (Type I) and Cobblestone (Type 2). In classical lissencephaly, the cerebral cortex becomes thickened and has only four identifiable layers rather than the usual six.

Cobblestone lissencephaly is named after the pebbled or cobblestone appearance of the cortical surface. This uneven cortical surface is due to incomplete organogenesis which leads to no distinguishable layers in the cerebral cortex. Cobblestone lissencephaly shows a reduction and abnormalities in the grey matter of the cerebral cortex.

== Causes ==
Causes of lissencephaly can include viral infections of the uterus or the fetus during the first trimester, or insufficient blood supply to the fetal brain early in pregnancy. There are also a number of genetic causes of lissencephaly, including mutation of the reelin gene (on chromosome 7), as well as other genes on the X chromosome and on chromosome 17. Genetic counseling is usually offered if there is a risk of lissencephaly, coupled with genetic testing.

=== Neuronal migration ===
Folding of the cerebral cortex is important in the development of overall brain function and cognitive abilities. Neuronal migration is the process by which neurons migrate to the final position in the brain during the development of the nervous system. This development of the nervous system occurs between 12 and 16 weeks of gestation. The neurons are created at the ventricular zone. The neurons then extend along the radial glia to reach the cortical zone. It is the disruption of the radial and tangential migration that causes reduced or absent gyri that is known as lissencephaly.

The lack of gyri causing a smooth appearance of the cerebral cortex is due to abnormal neuronal migration in the developmental stages of the nervous system. The cause of lissencephaly has been linked to both genetic and non-genetic factors. Three main types of lissencephaly have been identified, and although all types display similar symptoms, the pathogenesis of each type varies.

The genes associated with lissencephaly are still being discovered; however, due to advances in genetics, individual genes are being identified as the cause of lissencephaly. Mutations in LIS1, DCX (doublecortin), ARX (aristaless related homeobox), RELN have all been identified to cause lissencephaly. Viral infections can also cause lissencephaly.

The known genetic and viral causes are listed below:

==== LIS1 ====
LIS1 (also known as PAFAH1B1) is the most widely studied. LIS1 is located on chromosome 17p13.3. LIS1 is integral in regulating the motor protein dynein which plays an important role in the movement of neuronal nuclei along microtubules. The mutation or deletion involving LIS1 is associated with both Isolated Lissencephaly syndrome and Miller–Dieker syndrome. Miller-Dieker syndrome, however, has additional deletions of adjacent genes on chromosome 17 causing facial and other congenital abnormalities and defects. This mutation full or deletion of chromosome 17p13.3 leads to inadequate neuronal migration due to LIS1 encoding for an enzyme that interacts with the microtubule protein dynein. LIS1 mutation or deletion is not inherited from a parent and thus recurrence is unlikely.

A Chinese family with an autosomal dominant inheritance pattern and a mutation in this gene has been reported.

==== DCX ====
DCX or doublecortin encodes for the doublecortin protein which is similar to LIS1 as it encodes a microtubule associated protein that is related to microtubule function and transport in developing neuronal processes. DCX mutation causes the disorganisation of neocortical layering in the cerebral cortex leading to a reduced folding. DCX is localised to the X chromosome and thus this mutation may be inherited however it still can appear randomly. As it is an X chromosome linked abnormality males who inherit the gene are more likely to be severely affected. Females who inherit the DCX mutation have a more mild version of the syndrome.

==== ARX ====
The ARX gene encodes for the aristaless related homeobox genes which are active in the early embryonic development to control formation of many tissues and structure. ARX is involved in the development of the embryonic forebrain, migration and communication of neurons as well as migration and proliferation of interneurons. As ARX is expressed in the ganglionic eminences and the neocortical ventricular zone it can affect both radial and tangential migration. Similar to DCX, ARX is an X chromosome linked gene and is linked with other symptoms such as absence of portions of the brain, abnormal genitalia and severe epilepsy.

==== RELN ====
Reelin (RELN) is an extracellular matrix glycoproteins that is secreted to help with the regulation of neuronal migration. Lack of RELN in mice has shown deficiencies in migrating neurons. In reported cases, lissencephaly caused by RELN deficiency has been more severe in anterior brain regions with a very small cerebellum.

=== Viral infection ===
Lissencephaly has been recorded to have been caused by viruses and insufficient blood supply to the developing fetal brain. Cytomegalovirus (CMV) is a herpes-related virus that can cause congenital defects. CMV has a high affinity for the developing germinal matrix of the brain. The severity of the infection is proportional to the time in gestation that the fetus was infected. It is early infection that leads to lissencephaly. This is because early infection disrupts the migration and development of neurons.

== Diagnosis ==
The diagnosis of lissencephaly is usually made at birth or soon after by ultrasound, computed tomography (CT), or magnetic resonance imaging (MRI). However, these results should be interpreted cautiously since even experienced radiologists can misdiagnose polymicrogyria, a different developmental malformation of the brain, as lissencephaly.

Before birth, complex ultrasounds performed routinely during pregnancy may indicate the presence of a cerebral abnormality, but this method of diagnosis should be complemented by other methods, such as genetic studies and NMR, and the examination is not recommended as part of routine ultrasound examinations, unless family medical history or other reasons for suspecting brain malformation are present. The earliest point during gestation when it is possible to observe abnormal development of the brain surface is approximately in week 20, although ultrasound examinations in week 25–30 are more common. Up to this time, the fetal brain normally has a smooth appearance. If lissencephaly is suspected, chorionic villus sampling can test for some lissencephaly variants, but only those with a known genetic mutation.

=== Classification ===
The spectrum of lissencephaly is only now becoming more defined as neuroimaging and genetics have provided more insights into migration disorders. There are around 20 types of lissencephaly that make up the spectrum. Other causes which have not yet been identified are likely as well.

Different systems for classifying lissencephaly exist. One major distinction is "classic" (type I) vs. "cobblestone" (type II), but some systems add additional forms that fit into neither of these categories.

Some types of lissencephaly are described below (OMIM numbers are included where available):

Category	Types
Classic (or Type 1) lissencephaly – 607432	LIS1: lissencephaly due to PAFAH1B1 gene mutation, which subdivides into: type 1 isolated lissencephaly ( 601545); Miller–Dieker syndrome ( 247200); LISX1: lissencephaly due to doublecortin (DCX) gene mutation ( 300121); lissencephaly, type 1, isolated, without other known genetic defects
Cobblestone (or Type 2) lissencephaly	Walker–Warburg syndrome ( 236670), also called HARD(E) syndrome; Fukuyama syndrome ( 253800); Muscle–eye–brain disease (MEB) ( 253280)
Other types	LIS2: Norman–Roberts syndrome (mutation of reelin gene, 257320); LIS3: TUBA1A, 611603; LISX2: ARX, 300215; Microlissencephaly (lissencephaly and microcephaly)

== Treatment ==
Treatment for those with lissencephaly is symptomatic and depends on the severity and locations of the brain malformations. Treatment is tailored towards the symptoms of the individual. Therapies for lissencephaly are to deal with the symptoms as the syndrome is congenital. Supportive care may be needed to help with comfort and nursing needs. Seizures may be controlled with medication and hydrocephalus may require shunting. If feeding becomes difficult, a gastrostomy tube may be considered.

There are a number of organisations that raise awareness and funding for rare disabilities such as lissencephaly. They also seek to increase the quality of life for individuals living with related disabilities. In the United States, these organizations include Arc of the United States, National Organization for Rare Disorders, and March of Dimes.

== Prognosis ==
The prognosis for children with lissencephaly varies depending on the malformation and severity of the syndrome. Many individuals remain at a 3–5 month developmental level. Life expectancy is short and many children with lissencephaly will die before the age of 10. Some children with lissencephaly will be able to roll over, sit, reach for objects, and smile socially. Aspiration and respiratory disease are the most common causes of illness or death. In the past, life expectancy was said to be around two years of age. However, with advances in seizure control, and treatments for respiratory illness, most children affected can live well beyond that age. With other advances in therapy and the broader availability of services and equipment, some children with lissencephaly are able to walk with varying degrees of assistance and to perform other functions once thought too advanced.

== See also ==
- CEP85L—Gene associated with posterior predominant lissencephaly in a 2020 study
