= Misogamy =

Dislike of marriage

Misogamy is an aversion to or hatred of marriage. The word dates from the mid-17th century and combines the Greek misos (hatred) with gamos (marriage). Merriam-Webster date the first use of the word to around 1656.

== Medieval background ==
The idea of misogamy was important in the Christian church during the medieval period as a prerequisite for the celibacy required to occupy the highest positions in the church. It was developed in the philosophy of Theophrastus who became the "canonical authority on philosophic misogamy throughout the Middle Ages". Sara E. Diaz writes that two types of misogamy existed during the period, one advising all men against marriage, and another more limited form advising wise men against marriage.

== In literature ==
The literature of misogamy has been surveyed by Katharina Wilson and Elizabeth Makowski in their book Wykked Wyves and the Woes of Marriage: Misogamous Literature from Juvenal to Chaucer, published by the State University of New York in 1990.

== See also ==
- Criticism of marriage
- Gamophobia

== Sources ==
- Wilson, Katharina M.; Makowski, Elizabeth M. (1990). Wykked wyves and the woes of marriage: Misogamous literature from Juvenal to Chaucer. Albany: State University of New York Press (1990). ISBN 978-0-7914-0062-3.
