= Miller–Dieker syndrome =

Genetic disorder

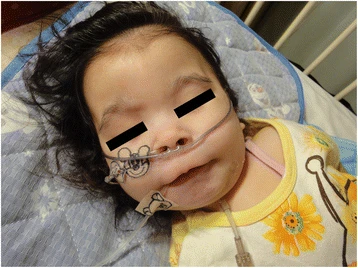
- Photo of child with typical facial features of MDS, with small jaw, prominent forehead, bitemporal hollowing, short nose with upturned nares, prominent upper lip.
- Specialty: Medical genetics

Miller–Dieker syndrome, also called Miller–Dieker lissencephaly syndrome (MDLS) or chromosome 17p13.3 deletion syndrome, is a micro deletion syndrome characterized by congenital malformations. Congenital malformations are physical defects detectable in an infant at birth which can involve many different parts of the body, including the brain, heart, lungs, liver, bones, or intestinal tract. MDS is a contiguous gene syndrome – a disorder due to the deletion of multiple gene loci adjacent to one another. The disorder arises from the deletion of part of the small arm of chromosome 17p (which includes both the LIS1 and 14-3-3 epsilon genes), leading to partial monosomy. There may be unbalanced translocations (e.g., 17q:17p or 12q:17p), or the presence of a ring chromosome 17.

This syndrome is unrelated to Miller syndrome, a rare genetic disorder, or Miller Fisher syndrome, a form of Guillain–Barré syndrome.

== Presentation ==
The brain is abnormally smooth, with fewer folds and grooves. The face, especially in children, has distinct characteristics including a short nose with upturned nares, thickened upper lip with a thin vermilion upper border, frontal bossing, small jaw, low-set posteriorly rotated ears, sunken appearance in the middle of the face, and hypertelorism of eyes. The forehead is prominent with bitemporal hollowing. Children typically also have microcephaly, a wide upper lip, and midface hypoplasia.

Characteristics that are not visual include intellectual disabilities, pre- and postnatal growth retardation, epilepsy, and reduced lifespan. Children may also experience breathing problems, dysphagia, feeding problems, hypotonia, spasticity, and muscle stiffness. Failure to thrive, feeding difficulties, seizures and decreased spontaneous activity are often seen. Death usually occurs in infancy and childhood. Multiple abnormalities of the brain, kidneys, and gastrointestinal tract (the stomach and intestines) may occur.

== Cause ==
MDS is a microdeletion syndrome involving loss of the gene PAFAH1B1 on chromosome 17 which is responsible for the syndrome's characteristic sign of lissencephaly. The loss of another gene, YWHAE, in the same region of chromosome 17 increases the severity of the lissencephaly in patients with Miller–Dieker syndrome. Additional genes in the deleted region are likely to contribute to the varied features of Miller–Dieker syndrome.

It may be a random event during the formation of reproductive cells or in early fetal development or due to familial chromosomal rearrangement called chromosomal translocation. In less than 20% of cases an unaffected parent carries a particular chromosomal rearrangement called a balanced translocation, in which no genetic material is gained or lost. Increased rate of unexplained fetal loss may be observed in those who have these suspectible balanced translocations although they may be otherwise asymptomatic. However, these translocations can become also unbalanced as they are passed to the next generation. Miller–Dieker syndrome is usually not inherited. The deletion event occurs randomly during gametogenesis (formation of eggs or sperm) or in early foetal development. Therefore, no history of the disorder is usually seen in their families.

== Diagnosis ==
The disease may be diagnosed by cytogenetic techniques like fluorescence in situ hybridization (FISH), testing for a microdeletion at LIS1.

=== Early detection ===
With the use of prenatal ultrasonographic imaging, early detection of abnormal brain development in the fetus with MDS can be seen. At birth, facial dysmorphism can be present in the infant. Young children, when affected, can have feeding difficulties, severe intellectual disability, developmental delay, and seizures. MRI facilitates early detection of this syndrome in children by revealing a "smooth brain" image, also called lissencephaly. Children with this syndrome may remain underdiagnosed because of rarity and the prevalence of facial features that appear to be dysmorphic. The syndrome shares distinct external features (phenotype) similar to more common syndromes. Lack of relevant family history may delay diagnosis. FDNA provides a service that in turn increases the chances of detecting these distinct characteristics, which, when shown to a geneticist, can assist in reaching the right medical diagnosis. If a couple has had one child with MDS, they can be offered prenatal screening in future pregnancies. This option is particularly important for the few (less than 20%) MDS families where one parent carries a balanced chromosome rearrangement. The risk of these couples having another child with MDS depends on the exact type of chromosomal rearrangement present and may be as high as 25–33%. For families in which both parents' chromosomes are normal, the risk of having another child with MDS is low (1% or less). Either chorionic villus sampling (CVS) or amniocentesis can be used early in a pregnancy to obtain a small sample of cells from the developing embryo for chromosome studies. Early prenatal diagnosis by ultrasound is not reliable because the brain is normally smooth until later in pregnancy. Couples who are considering prenatal diagnosis are usually advised to discuss the risks and benefits of this type of testing with a geneticist or genetic counselor.

=== Visuals of the brain ===
The brain is usually grossly abnormal in outline when someone is diagnosed with Miller–Dieker syndrome. Only a few shallow sulci and shallow Sylvian fissures are seen; this takes on an hourglass or figure-8 appearance on the axial imaging. The thickness and measurement for a person without MDS is 3–4 mm. With MDS, a person's cortex is measured at 12–20 mm.

== Treatment ==
While no cure for MDS is available yet, many complications associated with this condition can be treated, and a great deal can be done to support or compensate for functional disabilities. Because of the diversity of the symptoms, it can be necessary to see a number of different specialists and undergo various examinations, including:

- Developmental evaluation
- Cardiologists evaluation
- Otolaryngology
- Treatment of seizures
- Urologic evaluation
- Genetic counseling: though MDS is usually random and without a family history, a balanced chromosomal translocation in one of the parents can greatly raise the chances of a child of theirs being affected. If parents with an affected child are planning another pregnancy, they are usually advised to visit a genetic counselor for further information.

This disease is fairly uncommon, and treatment is scarce.

== Prognosis ==
Most individuals with this condition do not survive beyond childhood. Individuals with MDS usually die in infancy and therefore do not live to the age where they can reproduce and transmit MDS to their offspring. Due to more accurate diagnosis by MRI and improved management of symptoms with medical treatments including gastrostomy (feeding tubes), suction machines, seizure medications, tracheostomy, and management of secretions, more children are surviving into adulthood and have a better quality of life. Development of skills and core strength may be improved with physical therapy, but improvement is limited by the severity of the condition. Some children may be able to sit up, crawl, or say a few basic words, but most are severely developmentally delayed and remain at the level of infants for their lifetime. At all ages the most common cause of death is pneumonia, often after multiple cases have weakened the respiratory function.

== Epidemiology ==
Miller-Dieker is a rare disease.

== History ==
MDS was named for the two physicians, James Q. Miller and H. Dieker., who independently described the condition in the 1960s. The hallmark of MDS is lissencephaly, a condition in which the outer layer of the brain, the cerebral cortex, is abnormally thick and lacks the normal convolutions (gyri). In some areas of the brain, gyri are fewer in number but wider than normal (pachygyri). Other areas lack gyri entirely (agyri). Normally, during the third and fourth months of pregnancy, the brain cells in the baby multiply and move to the surface of the brain to form the cortex. Lissencephaly is caused by a failure of this nerve cell migration. MDS is often called Miller-Dieker lissencephaly syndrome.

JQ Miller described the disease and in 1969 H Dieker emphasized that it should also take the name lissencephaly syndrome because several malformations occur beyond the brain itself. When MDS was initially described, geneticists assumed it followed an autosomal recessive pattern of inheritance. In the early 1990s, several patients with Miller–Dieker syndrome were found to be missing a small portion of chromosome 17. (17p13.3) (a partial deletion).
