= Pachygyria =

Birth defect of abnormally large or thick brain folds

- Specialty: Medical genetics, neurology

Pachygyria (from Greek pachy 'thick, fat' gyri) is a congenital malformation of the cerebral hemisphere. It results in unusually thick convolutions of the cerebral cortex. Typically, children have developmental delay and seizures, the onset and severity depending on the severity of the cortical malformation. Infantile spasms are common in affected children, as is intractable epilepsy.

== Presentation ==
The term 'pachygyria' does not directly relate to a specific malformation but rather is used to generally describe physical characteristics of the brain in association with several neuronal migration disorders; most commonly disorders relating to varied degrees of lissencephaly. Lissencephaly is present in 1 of 85,470 births and the life span of those affected is short as only a few survive past the age of 20. Pachygyria is a condition identified by a type of cortical genetic malformation. Clinicians will subjectively determine the malformation based on the degree of malposition and the extent of thickened abnormal grey differentiation present.

=== Connections to epilepsy, lissencephaly, and subcortical band heterotopia ===
Various degrees of intensity and locations of epilepsy are associated with malformations of cortical development. Researchers suggest that approximately 40% of children diagnosed with drug-resistant epilepsy have some degree of cortical malformation.

Lissencephaly (to which pachygyria is most closely linked) is associated with severe mental retardation, epilepsy, and motor disability. Two characteristics of lissencephaly include its absence of convolutions (agyria) and decreased presence of convolutions (pachygyria). The types of seizures associated with lissencephaly include:

- persisting spasms
- focal seizures
- tonic seizures
- atypical seizures
- atonic seizures

Other possible symptoms of lissencephaly include telecanthus, estropia, hypertelorism, varying levels of intellectual disability, cerebellar hypoplasia, corpus callosum aplasia, and decreased muscle tone and tendon reflexes. Over 90% of children affected with lissencephaly have seizures.

Patients with subcortical band heterotopia (another disorder associated with pachygyria) typically have milder symptoms and their cognitive function is closely linked to the thickness of the subcortical band and the degree of pachygyria present.

== Causes ==
Pachygyria is caused by a breakdown in the fetal neuronal migration process due to genetic or possibly environmental influences. The affected cerebral cortex will typically have only four developed layers instead of the normal six. One of the best known and most common types of neuronal migration disorders is lissencephaly, a diffuse cortical malformation relating directly to agyria and pachygyria. Incomplete neuronal migration during the early fetal brain development is the precursor to lissencephaly. Should neurons follow an abnormal migration during development possible cortical malformations include classical lissencephaly (as stated above) and subcortical band heterotopia with an agyria-pachygyria band spectrum.

=== Normal neuronal migration ===
Normal neuronal migration involves the development of six cortical layers, each one performing distinct functions.

Normal cerebral development occurs in three dynamic and overlapping stages:

- first stage: stem cells proliferate and differentiate into neurons or glial cells within the forebrain and the ventricular and subventricular zones lining the cerebral cavity;
- in humans this stage lasts from gestational weeks 5–6 to 16–20;
- second stage: migration away from the origin in a radial fashion along the glial fibers from the periventricular region of the ganglionic eminences towards the pial surface;
  - the generations settle into a pattern within the cortical plate during this stage;
  - in humans this stage lasts from gestational weeks 6–7 to 20–24;
- third stage: apoptosis and synaptogenesis within the six cortical layers to develop correct cortical organization;
  - in humans this stage lasts from gestational week 16 until long after birth.

Most types of incomplete neuronal migration to the cortex occur during the third and fourth gestational months. The abnormal migration of the neurons causes them to not reach their proper final destinations, which results in failure of the sulci and gyri to form.

The stage of cortical development at which migration is arrested is directly related to the level of structural malposition.

One of the most critical stages in brain development is when the post-mitotic neurons migrate from the ventricular zone to form the cortical plate. Migration arrested toward the latter part of development usually restricts the abnormal cell position to the cortex level.

=== Neuronal migration disorder caused by genetic mutations ===
Several genetic mutations have been isolated and linked to specific malformations of the cerebral cortex. Genes shown to cause lissencephaly include both autosomal and X-linked genes. Below, the mutations of LIS1 or DCX genes are discussed as they are most commonly linked to neuronal migration disorders including lissencephaly-pachygyria and subcortical band heterotopia.

=== LIS1 ===
LIS1 is responsible for the autosomal form of lissencephaly. Mutations of the LIS1 gene are associated with about 80% of those affected with lissencephaly. LIS1 was the first human neuronal migration gene to be cloned. It is responsible for encoding the alpha subunit of the intracellular Ib isoform of platelet-activating factor acetylhydrolase. It is located on chromosome 17p13.3 and has 11 exons with a coding region of 1233bp. LIS1 protein appears to interact with tubulin to suppress microtubule dynamics. The protein is highly conserved and studies have shown that it participates in cytoplasmic dynein-mediated nucleokinesis, somal translocation, cell motility, mitosis, and chromosome segregation. LIS1 encodes for a 45kDa protein called PAFAH1B1 that contains seven WD40 repeats required for proper neuronal migration. The LIS1 gene encodes for a protein similar to the β subunit of G proteins responsible for degrading bioactive lipid platelet-activating factor (PAF). This leads to theories that LIS1 might exert its effect on migration through microtubules. Specific concentrations of PAF may be necessary for optimal neuronal migration by influencing cell morphology adhesion properties. Studies have shown that addition of PAF or inhibition of platelet-activating factor acetylhydrolase (PAF-AH) decreases cerebellar granule cell migration in vitro. Addition of PAF to hippocampal cells have shown growth cone collapse and neurite retraction. LIS1 knockout homozygous null mice die during embryogenesis and heterozygous mice survive with delayed neuronal migration confirmed by in vitro and in vivo cell migration assays. Most lissencephaly cases are associated with deletions of mutations of the LIS1 gene and the results are usually more severe in the posterior brain regions.

One study showed that of an isolated group of patients with lissencephaly, 40% resulted from an LIS1 deletion and another 25% resulted from an intragenic mutation of the gene. Patients with missense mutations tend to have less severe symptoms, pachygyria, and rare cases of subcortical band heterotopia. Truncated (shortened) mutations of LIS1 tend to cause severe lissencephaly.

=== Doublecortin ===
Doublecortin (DCX or XLIS) mutations are responsible for X-linked disorders. While LIS1 mutations tend to cause severe malformations in the posterior brain, DCX mutations focus much of their destruction on anterior malformations and are linked to lissencephaly in males and subcortical band heterotopias in females. Women with DCX mutations tend to have an anteriorly-predominant subcortical band heterotopia and pachygyria. DCX was the first known gene causing X-linked lissencephaly and subcortical band heterotopia. It is found on chromosome Xq22.3-q23 and has nine exons that code for 360 proteins. DCX is expressed exclusively in the fetal brain.

Spastic cerebral palsy is by far the most common type, occurring in 70–80% of all cases. Moreover, spastic CP accompanies one of the other types in 30% of all cases. People with this type are hypertonic and have a neuromuscular condition stemming from damage to the corticospinal tract or the motor cortex that affects the nervous system's ability to receive gamma amino butyric acid in the area(s) affected by the disability. Spastic CP is further classified by topography dependent on the region of the body affected; these include:

Spastic hemiplegia (one side being affected). Generally, injury to muscle-nerves controlled by the brain's left side will cause a right body deficit, and vice versa. Typically, people that have spastic hemiplegia are the most ambulatory, although they generally have dynamic equinus on the affected side and are primarily prescribed ankle-foot orthoses to prevent said equinus.[11] Spastic diplegia (the lower extremities are affected with little to no upper-body spasticity). The most common form of the spastic forms. Most people with spastic diplegia are fully ambulatory and have a scissors gait. Flexed knees and hips to varying degrees are common. Hip problems, dislocations, and in three-quarters of spastic diplegics, also strabismus (crossed eyes), can be present as well. In addition, these individuals are often nearsighted. The intelligence of a person with spastic diplegia is unaffected by the condition. Spastic tetraplegia (all four limbs affected equally). People with spastic quadriplegia are the least likely to be able to walk, or if they can, to want to walk, because their muscles are too tight and it is too much effort to do so. Some children with quadriplegia also have hemiparetic tremors, an uncontrollable shaking that affects the limbs on one side of the body and impairs normal movement. Occasionally, terms such as monoplegia, paraplegia, triplegia, and pentaplegia may also be used to refer to specific manifestations of the spasticity.

== Pathogenesis ==
Pachygyria, lissencephaly (smooth brain), and polymicrogyria (multiple small gyri) are all the results of abnormal cell migration. The abnormal migration is typically associated with a disorganized cellular architecture, failure to form six layers of cortical neurons (a four-layer cortex is common), and functional problems. The abnormal formation of the brain may be associated with seizures, developmental delay, and mental dysfunctions.

Normally, the brain cells begin to develop in the periventricular region (germinal matrix) and then migrate from medial to lateral, to form the cerebral cortex.

== Diagnosis ==
Different imaging modalities are commonly used for diagnosis. While computed tomography (CT) provides higher spatial resolution imaging of the brain, cerebral cortex malformations are more easily visualized in vivo and classified using magnetic resonance imaging (MRI) which provides higher contrast imaging and better delineation of white and gray matter.

Diffuse pachygyria (a mild form of lissencephaly) can be seen on an MRI as thickened cerebral cortices with few and large gyri and incomplete development of the Sylvian fissures.

- severe epilepsy
- reduced longevity
- varying degrees of developmental delay
- intractable epilepsy
- spasticity

Cognitive ability correlates with the thickness of any subcortical band present and the degree of pachygyria.

=== Classifications ===
The degree of cerebral cortex malformation caused by genetic mutations is classified by the degree of malposition and the extent of faulty grey matter differentiation.

Neuronal migration disorders are generally classified into three groups:

- lissencephaly/subcortical band heterotopia
- cobblestone
- 'other' heterotopias

The 'other' types are associated with corpus callosum agenesis or cerebellar hypoplasia while the cobblestone lissencephalies are associated with eye and muscle disorders.

Classical lissencephaly, also known as type I or generalized agyria-pachygyria, is a severe brain malformation of a smooth cerebral surface, abnormally thick (10–20 mm) cortex with four layers, widespread neuronal heterotopia, enlarged ventricles, and agenesis or malformation of the corpus callosum. Classical lissencephaly can range from agyria to regional pachygyria and is usually present along with subcortical band heterotopia (known as 'double cortex' to describe the circumferential bands of heterotopic neurons located beneath the cortex). Subcortical band heterotopia is a malformation slightly different from lissencephaly that is now classified under the agyria-pachygyria-band spectrum because it consists of a gyral pattern consistent with broad convolutions and an increased cortical thickness. The established classification scheme for lissencephaly is based on the severity (grades 1–6) and the gradient.

- Grade 1: generalized agyria
- Grade 2: variable degree of agyria
- Grade 3: variable degree of pachygyria
- Grade 4: generalized pachygyria
- Grade 5: mixed pachygyria and subcortical band heterotopia
- Grade 6: subcortical band heterotopia alone
- Gradient 'a': from posterior to anterior gradient
- Gradient 'b': from anterior to posterior gradient

Grade 1 and Grade 4 are very rare. Grade 2 is observed in children with Miller–Dieker syndrome (a combination of lissencephaly with dysmorphic facial features, visceral abnormalities, and polydactyly). The most common lissencephaly observed, consisting of frontotemporal pachygyria and posterior agyria, is Grade 3. Another malformation worth mentioning because of its connections to pachygyria is polymicrogyria. Polymicrogyria is characterized by many small gyri separated by shallow sulci, slightly thin cortex, neuronal heterotopia and enlarged ventricle and is often superimposed on pachygyria.

== Treatment ==
Because pachygyria is a structural defect no treatments are currently available other than symptomatic treatments, especially for associated seizures. Another common treatment is a gastrostomy (insertion of a feeding tube) to reduce possible poor nutrition and repeated aspiration pneumonia.

== Microcephalic osteodysplastic primordial dwarfism ==
Microcephalic osteodysplastic primordial dwarfism (MOPD) type II is an autosomal multisystem disorder including severe pre- and post-natal growth retardation, microcephaly with Seckel syndrome–like facial appearance, and distinctive skeletal alterations. Usually those affected have mild to moderate intellectual disability.

== See also ==
- Lissencephaly
- Polymicrogyria
