= Polymicrogyria =

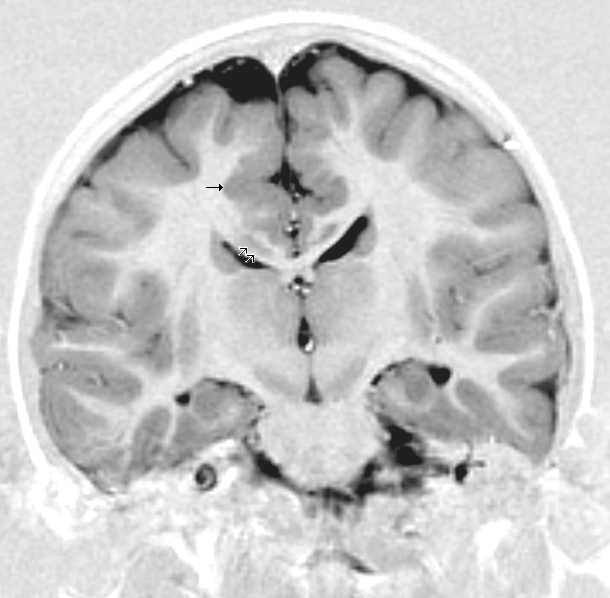
- This child presented with seizures. The coronal true inversion recovery sequence shows thickened and disordered cortex in superior frontal and cingulate gyri bilaterally (arrow). There are small convolutions visible at the corticomedullary junction. The appearance is that of cortical dysplasia, with polymicrogyria more likely than pachygyria due to the small convolutions visible. There are also small foci of grey matter signal in the corpus callosum, deep to the dysplastic cortex (double arrows). These probably represent areas of grey matter heterotopia.
- Specialty: Neurology

Polymicrogyria (PMG) is a condition that affects the development of the human brain by multiple small gyri (microgyri) creating excessive folding of the brain leading to an abnormally thick cortex. This abnormality can affect either one region of the brain or multiple regions.

The time of onset has yet to be identified; however, it has been found to occur before birth in either the earlier or later stages of brain development. Early stages include impaired proliferation and migration of neuroblasts, while later stages show disordered post-migration development.

The symptoms experienced differ depending on what part of the brain is affected. There is no specific treatment for this condition, but there are medications that can control the symptoms such as seizures, delayed development or weakened muscles as some of the noted effects.

== Syndromes ==
The main patterns of polymicrogyria are: perisylvian (61%), generalised (13%), frontal (5%), and parasagittal parieto-occipital (3%) and 11% is associated with gray matter heterotopia (grey matter is located in the white matter instead of usual location in the cerebral cortex).

=== Bilateral frontal polymicrogyria (BFP) ===
Polymicrogyria
- Other names: PMG
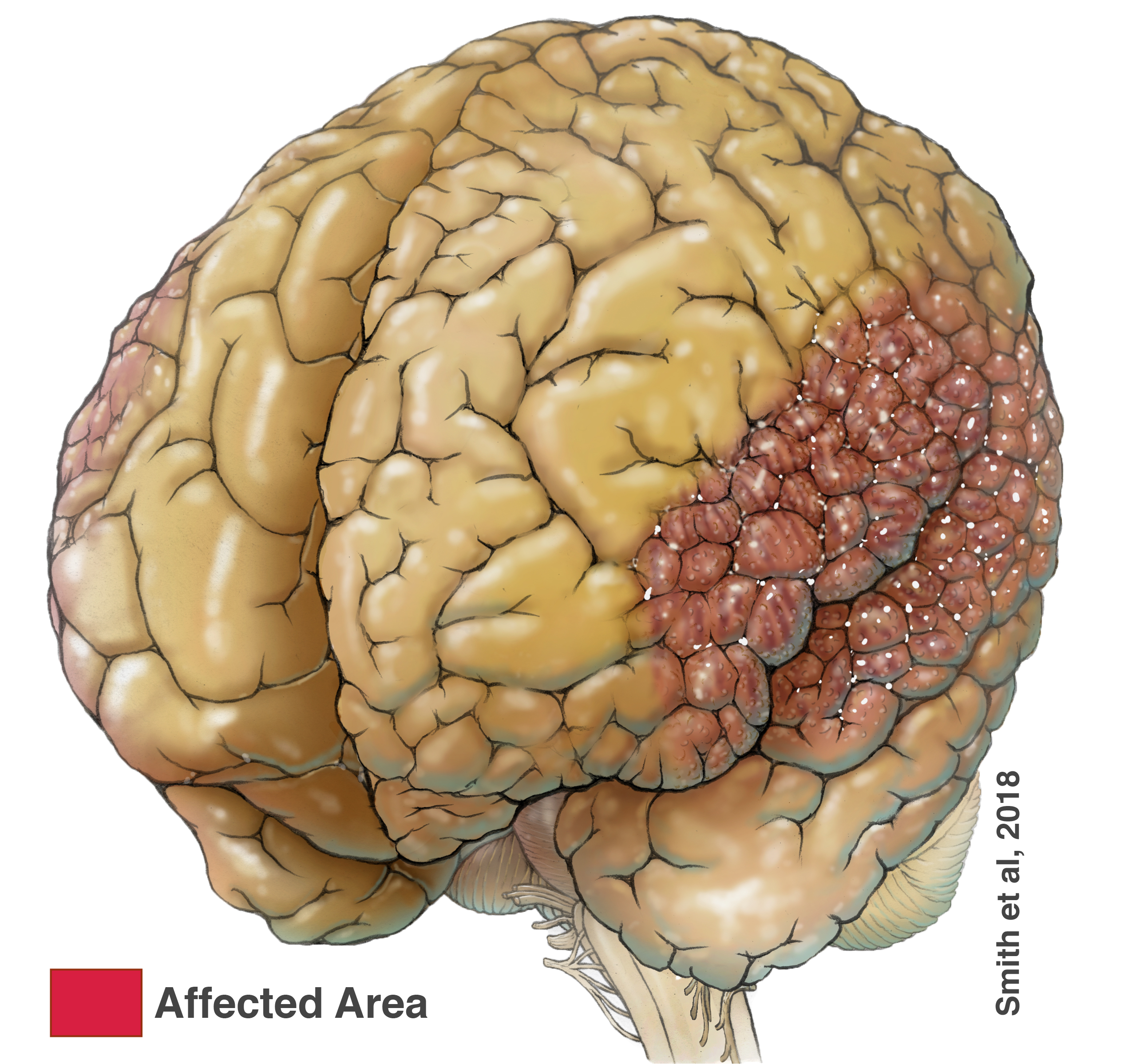
- Bilateral perisylvian polymicrogyria
- Specialty: Neurology

BFP appears to be a symmetrical polymicrogyria that extends anteriorly from the frontal poles to the posterior precentral gyrus, and inferiorly to the frontal operculum. Patients who had polymicrogyria distribution similar to this also experienced similar symptoms including delayed motor and language developments, spastic hemiparesis or quadriparesis, and forms of mild intellectual disability.

=== Bilateral frontoparietal polymicrogyria (BFPP) ===
BFPP was one of the first discovered forms of polymicrogyria to have a gene identified linking to the syndromes caused. This gene is called GPR56. Symmetrical distribution is also evident in this form, but more distinctly, patients with BFPP were found to have atrophy of the cerebellum and brain stem, as well as bilateral white matter abnormalities. BFPP is characterized by esotropia, global development delay, pyramidal signs, cerebral signs, and seizures. Esotropia is also known as dysconjugate gaze, and is a common feature of severe static encephalopathy. This differentiates BFPP from the other bilateral polymicrogyria syndromes.

=== Bilateral perisylvian polymicrogyria (BPP) ===
BPP is similar to the other types of polymicrogyria in that it is usually symmetrical, but BPP can vary among patients. BPP is characterized by its location; the cerebral cortex deep in the sylvian fissures is thickened and abnormally infolded, as well as the sylvian fissures extending more posteriorly up to the parietal lobes and more vertically oriented. BPP has been classified into a grading system consisting of four different grades that describe the variations in severity:

1. Grade 1: Perisylvian polymicrogyria extends to either one or both poles
2. Grade 2: Perisylvian polymicrogyria extends past the perisylvian region, but not to either of the poles
3. Grade 3: Perisylvian polymicrogyria is contained in the perisylvian region only
4. Grade 4: Perisylvian polymicrogyria is contained in the posterior perisylvian region only

The grades move from most severe (Grade 1) to least severe (Grade 4). Although BFPP was the first form of polymicrogyria to be discovered, BPP was the first form to be described and is also the most common form of polymicrogyria. The clinical characterizations of BPP "include pseudobulbar palsy with diplegia of the facial, pharyngeal and masticory muscles (facio-pharyngo-glosso-masticatory paresis), pyramidal signs, and seizures." These can result in drooling, feeding issues, restricted tongue movement, and dysarthria. Disorders in language development have also been associated with BPP, but the extent of language disorder depends on the severity of cortical damage. Patients who have BPP can also have pyramidal signs that vary in severity, and can be either unilateral or bilateral.

The sodium channel SCN3A has been implicated in BPP.

=== Bilateral parasagittal parieto-occipital polymicrogyria (BPOP) ===
BPOP is located in the parasagittal and mesial regions of the parieto-occipital cortex. This form has been associated with IQ scores that range from average intelligence to mild intellectual disability, seizures, and cognitive slowing. The age of seizure onset has been found to occur anywhere from 20 months to 15 years, and in most cases the seizures were intractable (meaning hard to control).

=== Bilateral generalised polymicrogyria (BGP) ===
BGP is most severe in the perisylvian regions, but occurs in a generalised distribution. Associated factors include a reduced volume of white matter and ventriculomegaly. BGP tends to show excessively folded and fused gyri of an abnormally thin cerebral cortex, and an absence of the normal six-layered structure. The abnormally thin cortex is a key factor that distinguishes this form of polymicrogyria from the others, which are characterized by an abnormally thick cortex. Most of the patients have cognitive and motor delay, spastic hemi- or quadriparesis, and seizures in varying degrees. The seizures also vary at age of onset, type, and severity. There have been pseudobulbar signs reported with BGP, which are also seen in patients with BPP. This association leads to the belief that there is overlap between patients with BGP and patients with grade 1 BPP.

=== Unilateral polymicrogyria ===
The region in which unilateral polymicrogyria occurs has been generalized into different cortical areas. Features associated with this form of polymicrogyria are similar to the other forms and include spastic hemiparesis, intellectual disability in variable degrees, and seizures. The features depend on the exact area and extent to which polymicrogyria has affected the cortex. Patients who have unilateral polymicrogyria have been reported to also have electrical status epilepticus during sleep (EPES), and all had seizures.

== Signs and symptoms ==
The diagnosis of PMG is merely descriptive and is not a disease in itself, nor does it describe the underlying cause of the brain malformation.

Polymicrogyria may be just one piece of a syndrome of developmental abnormalities, because children born with it may have a wide spectrum of other problems, including global developmental disabilities, mild to severe intellectual disabilities, motor dysfunctions including speech and swallowing problems, respiratory problems, seizures. Though it is difficult to make a predictable prognosis for children with the diagnosis of PMG, there are some generalized clinical findings according to the areas of the brain that are affected.

- Bilateral frontal polymicrogyria (BFP) – Cognitive and motor delay, spastic quadriparesis, epilepsy
- Bilateral frontoparietal polymicrogyria (BFPP) – Severe cognitive and motor delay, seizures, dysconjugate gaze, cerebellar dysfunction
- Bilateral perisylvian polymicrogyria (BPP) – Pseudobulbar signs, cognitive impairment, epilepsy, some with arthrogryposis or lower motor neuron disease
- Bilateral parasagittal parieto-occipital polymicrogyria (BPPP) – Partial seizures, some with intellectual developmental disorder
- Bilateral generalized polymicrogyria (BGP) – Cognitive and motor delay of variable severity, seizures

Rates of symptoms in PMG include 78% for epilepsy, 70% for global developmental delay, 51% for spasticity, 50% for microcephaly, 45% for dysmorphic features (e.g., abnormal facies or hand, feet, or digital anomalies), and 5% for macrocephaly. In the BPP subtype of PMG, up to 75% may have mild to moderate intellectual disability.

== Cause ==
The cause of polymicrogyria is unclear. It is generally agreed that PMG occurs during late neuronal migration (when majority of the neurons arrived at cerebral cortex after their starting points around the ventricular system of the brain) or early cortical organization of fetal development. Evidence for both genetic and non-genetic causes exists.

Chromosomal abnormalities have been identified in PMG such as 22q11.2 deletion (characterised by bilateral perisylvian PMG, heart defects, facial dysmorphism, microcephaly) and 1p36 deletion (bilateral perisylvian PMG, intellectual disability, dysmorphic facial features and microcephaly). Apart from that, mutations in more than 30 genes have been associated with PMG. Common genes associated with PMG are TUBA1A and PIK3R2. Association with the gene WDR62 (diffuse or asymmetric PMG) and SCN3A has also been identified, as well as other ion channels such as KCN, CACNA, GRIN, and GABAR. Other genes implicated are: GPR56 (Bilateral frontoparietal PMG), TUBB2B (anterior predominant PMG), NDE1 (Diffuse PMG), AKT3 (Bilateral perisylvian PMG), and PIK3CA (Bilateral perisylvian PMG).

Non-genetic causes include defects in placental oxygenation and in association with congenital infections, particularly cytomegalovirus, syphilis, and varicella zoster virus.

== Pathology ==
Polymicrogyria is a disorder of neuronal migration, resulting in structurally abnormal cerebral hemispheres. The Greek roots of the name describe its salient feature: many [poly] small [micro] gyri (convolutions in the surface of the brain). It is also characterized by shallow sulci, a slightly thicker cortex, neuronal heterotopia and enlarged ventricles. When many of these small folds are packed tightly together, PMG may resemble pachygyria (a few "thick folds" - a mild form of lissencephaly).

The pathogenesis of polymicrogyria is still being researched for understanding though it is historically heterogeneous-4. It results from both genetic and destructive events. While polymicrogyria is associated with genetic mutations, none of these are the sole cause of this abnormality. The cortical development of mammals requires specific cell functions that all involve microtubules, whether it is because of mitosis, specifically cell division, cell migration or neurite growth. Some mutations that affect the role of microtubules and are studied as possible contributors, but not causes, to polymicrogyria include TUBA1A and TUBB2B. TUBB2B mutations are known to contribute to polymicrogyria either with or without congenital fibrosis or the external ocular muscles, as well as bilateral perisylvian.

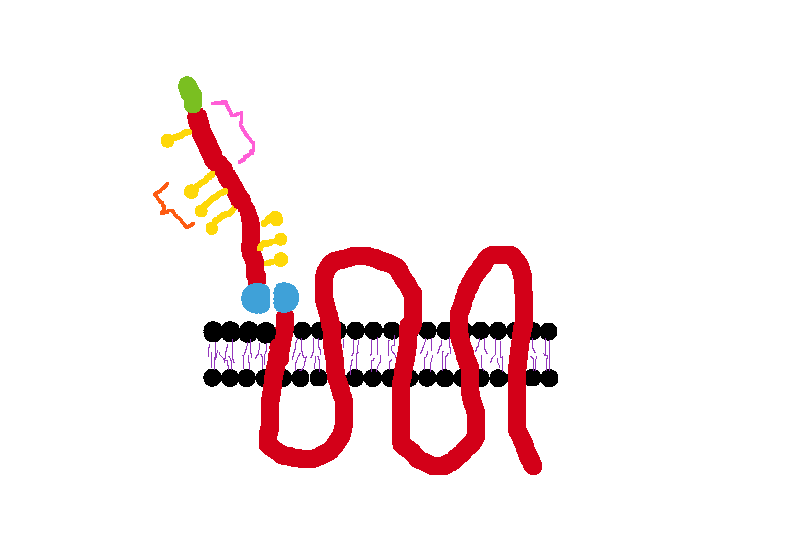
GPR56 protein structuregreen: signal peptideyellow: N-Glycosylation siteblue: GPS motiforange bracket: 108-177 aa STPpink bracket: 27-160 aa Ligand binding domain Referenced article: Singer K, Luo R, Jeong SJ, Piao X (2013). "GPR56 and the developing cerebral cortex: cells, matrix, and neuronal migration". Mol. Neurobiol. 47 (1): 186–96. doi:10.1007/s12035-012-8343-0. PMC 3538897. PMID 23001883.

The gene GPR56 is a member of the adhesion G protein-coupled receptor family and is directly related to causing Bilateral frontoparietal polymicrogyria, (BFPP)-6. Other genes in the G protein-coupled receptor family have effects with this condition as well such as the outer brain development, but not enough is known to carry out all the research properly so the main focus is starting with the specific GR56 gene within this category. This malformation of the brain is a result of numerous small gyri taking over the surface of the brain that should otherwise be normally convoluted. This gene is currently under studies to help identify and contribute to the knowledge about this condition. It is studied to provide information on the causes along with insight into the mechanisms of normal cortical development and the regional patterning of the cerebral cortex using magnetic resonance imagine, MRI. Specifically found to polymicrogyria due to mutation of this gene are myelination defects. GPR56 is observed to be important for myelinations due to a mutation in this gene results in reduced white matter volume and signal changes as shown in MRI's. While the cellular roles of GPR56 in myelination remains unclear, this information will be used to further other studies done with this gene.

Another gene that has been associated with this condition is GRIN1 and GRIN2B.

== Diagnosis ==
The effects of PMG can be either focal or widespread. Although both can have physiological effects on the patient, it is hard to determine PMG as the direct cause because it can be associated with other brain malformations. Most commonly, PMG is associated with Aicardi and Warburg micro syndromes. These syndromes both have frontoparieto polymicrogyria as their anomalies. To ensure proper diagnosis, doctors thus can examine a patient through neuroimaging or neuropathological techniques.

=== Neuroimaging techniques ===
Pathologically, PMG is defined as "an abnormally thick cortex formed by the piling upon each other of many small gyri with a fused surface." To view these microscopic characteristics, magnetic resonance imaging (MRI) is used. First physicians must distinguish between polymicrogyria and pachygyria. Pachygria leads to the development of broad and flat regions in the cortical area, whereas the effect of PMG is the formation of multiple small gyri. Underneath a computerized tomography (CT scan) scan, these both appear similar in that the cerebral cortex appears thickened. However, MRI with a T1 weighted inversion recovery will illustrate the gray-white junction that is characterized by patients with PMG. An MRI is also usually preferred over the CT scan because it has sub-millimeter resolution. The resolution displays the multiple folds within the cortical area, which is continuous with the neuropathology of an infected patient.

=== Neuropathological techniques ===
Gross examination exposes a pattern of many small gyri clumped together, which causes an irregularity in the brain surface. The cerebral cortex, which in normal patients is six cell layers thick, is also thinned. As mentioned prior, the MRI of an affected patient shows what appears to be a thickening of the cerebral cortex because of the tiny folds that aggregate causing a more dense appearance. However, gross analysis shows that an affected patient can have as few as one to all six of these layers missing.

== Treatment ==
The PMG malformation cannot be reversed, but the symptoms can be treated. The removal of affected areas through hemispherectomy has been used in some cases to reduce the amount a seizure activity. Few patients are candidates for surgery. The global developmental delay that affects 94% can also be mitigated in some patients with occupational, physical, and speech therapies. The important aspect to realize is PMG affects each patient differently and treatment options and mitigation techniques will vary.

== Epidemiology ==
The incidences of PMG and its different forms are unknown. However, the frequency of cortical dysplasia in general has been estimated to be 1 in 2,500 newborns. PMG is one of the best-known and most common malformations of cortical development, accounting for 20% of all cases. In the largest series of PMG cases, the bilateral perisylvian pattern was the most common topological pattern (52% of cases) followed by the unilateral perisylvian pattern (9% of cases).

== History ==
Limited information was known about cerebral disorders until the development of modern technologies. Brain imaging and genetic sequencing greatly increased the information known about polymicrogyria from the early 2000s onwards. Understanding about development, classification and localization of the disorder have greatly improved. For instance, localization of specific cortex regions affected by the disease was determined. This allowed for clinical symptoms of patients to be linked with localized cortex areas affected. A gene that was identified to be a contributor to bilateral frontoparietal polymicrogyria was GPR56.

== See also ==
- Augmentative and alternative communication
- Bilateral frontoparietal polymicrogyria (genetic lesion)
- Epilepsy Phenome/Genome Project
