= Epilepsy Phenome/Genome Project =

The Epilepsy Phenome/Genome Project (EPGP) is a government-funded study to identify genes that influence the development of epilepsy and genes that affect the response to treatment. The study involves 25 major epilepsy centers and more than 150 scientists and clinical staff around the United States, Australia and Argentina. The goal is to create a repository of clinical and genetic information on a select group of patients with epilepsy. The hope is that this information will reveal new insights and improve diagnosis and treatment.

EPGP is funded by the National Institutes of Health via The National Institute for Neurological Disorders and Stroke (NINDS).

The long-term goal of EPGP is to identify potential molecular targets that could be the basis of much more specific and effective treatments for patients who have epilepsy, and the prevention of epilepsy in those at risk.

== Background on genes and epilepsy ==
Although heredity has been known since antiquity to cause epilepsy, the progress to date in identifying the genetic basis of epilepsy has been limited primarily to the discovery of single gene mutations that cause epilepsy in relatively rare families. For the more common types of epilepsy, heredity plays a subtler role, and it is thought that a combination of mutations in multiple genes likely determine an individual’s susceptibility to seizures, as well as the responsiveness to antiepileptic medications.

== Phenotyping ==
The approach to teasing apart the more complicated genetic factors in epilepsy requires a very large number of patients whose epilepsy has been extremely well characterized. EPGP investigators will be enrolling 3,750 patients and 3,000 controls over the course of the study.

Details about seizure types, EEGs, imaging studies, and effects of treatment will be collected and archived in a central data repository, and all participants will be asked to submit a sample of blood as a source of their DNA. Once this first phase of the study is completed, genomic analyses will be used to identify potential connections between patterns of DNA sequences and specific characteristics of epilepsy in the study population.

== Genotyping ==
=== Aim 1: Identify genetic variants of common forms of epilepsy ===
We hypothesize that a substantial portion of the inherited risk of epilepsy and pharmacoresistance is due to a small to moderate number of common frequency (frequency > 1%) allelic variants with modest to moderate relative risks.

SubAim 1.1 will identify loci contributing to the occurrence and type of epilepsy.

SubAim 1.2 will identify loci associated with pharmacoresponse to AEDs.

=== Aim 2: Determine genetic influence in rare, severe epilepsy ===
We will determine the role of de novo copy number polymorphisms (CNPs) in IS, LGS, and PMG/PVNH. We will evaluate the role of inherited CNPs in IS, LGS, and PMG/PVNH.

== See also ==
- Epilepsy in Females with Mental Retardation (EFMR)
