= List of Greek and Latin roots in English/A–G =

The following is an alphabetical list of Greek and Latin roots, stems, and prefixes commonly used in the English language from A to G. See also the lists from H to O and from P to Z.

Some of those used in medicine and medical technology are not listed here but instead in the entry for List of medical roots, suffixes and prefixes.

== Collation ==
Note that root groups such as "ad-, a-, ac-, af-, ag-, al-, am-, an-, ap-, ar-, as-, at-" are collated under the head item (first item listed), which is sometimes followed by alternative roots that might have collated earlier in the table had they been listed separately (in this example, "a-" and "ac-").

== Roots A-G ==
Lists of Greek and Latin roots in English beginning with other letters:
- A
- B
- C
- D
- E
- F
- G
- H
- I
- J
- K
- L
- M
- N
- O
- P
- Q
- R
- S
- T
- U
- V
- X
- Z

== A ==
Root	Meaning in English	Origin language	Etymology (root origin)	English examples
ab-, a-, abs-, au-	away from, down, off	Latin	ab	abdication, abduction, aberrant, abnormal, abrasion, absent, absorb, abstain, abstemious, abstraction, aversion, avulsion
abac-	slab	Ancient Greek	ἄβαξ, ἄβακος (ábax, ábakos), ἀβακίσκος (abakískos)	abaciscus, abacus, abax
ac-, acm-, acr-	point	Greek	ἀκή (akḗ), ἀκίς, ἀκίδος (akís, akídos), ἀκόνη (akónē), ἄκρος (ákros), ἄκρον (ákron), ἄκρα	Acidanthera, acme, acmeism, acmesthesia, acmic, acne
ac-, ace-	cure	Greek	ἀκεῖσθαι (akeîsthai), ἀκή (akḗ), ἄκος, ἄκεος (ákos, ákeos)	aceology, autacoid, panacea
academ-	Akademos	Greek	Ἀκάδημος (Akádēmos)	academe, academia, academic, academy
acanth-	thorn	Greek	ἀκή, ἄκανθα (ákantha)	Acanthaster, Acanthion, acanthite, Acanthocephala, acanthocephaliasis, acanthocyte, Acanthomintha, Acanthosaura, Acanthus, Metriacanthosaurus, neuroacanthocytosis
acar-	mite	Greek	ἀκαρί (akarí)	acariasis, acarid, acariphagous, acaroid, acarology, acarophobia, Acarus
accipitr-	hawk	Latin	accipiter	Accipiter, accipitrine
acer-, acri-	bitter, sharp, sour	Latin	ācer, ācris, acerbus, acere	acerbic, acrid, acrimonious, acrimony, exacerbate
acet-	sour, vinegar	Latin	acētum	acetabulum, acetate, acetic, acetone, acetum, triacetate
acid-	acidic, sour	Latin	acidus	acidiferous, acidity, acidosis, acidulation, acidulous
acr-	height, summit, tip, top	Greek	ἀκή (akḗ), ἄκρος (ákros) "high", "extreme", ἄκρον (ákron)	acrobat, acrobatics, acrochordon, acromegalia, acromegaly, acromion, acronym, acrophobia, acropolis, acrostic, acroterion, acrotomophilia
actin-	beam, ray	Greek	ἀκτίς, ἀκτῖνος (aktís, aktînos)	actinic, actinism, actinium, actinocerid, actinodrome, actinoid, actinomere, actinometer, actinomorphic, Actinomyces, actinophryid, actinopod, Actinopterygii, actinotherapy, Actinozoa
acu-, acut-	sharp, pointed	Latin	acutus, past participle of acuere "to sharpen", from acus "needle"	acerose, acupuncture, acumen, acute, acutifoliate
ad-, a-, ac-, af-, ag-, al-, am-, an-, ap-, ar-, as-, at-	movement to or toward; in addition to	Latin	ad "to", "toward"	accept, accurate, adapt, addition, address, adept, adherent, adhesive, adjust, admit, admonish, advertisement, affect, agglomerate, aggregate, aggression, allege, allude, ammunition, annectent, approximate, arreption, arride, arrogant, ascend, assault, assimilate, attend, attract
aden-	gland	Greek	ἀδήν, ἀδένος (adḗn, adénos)	adenocarcinoma, adenoid, adenoidectomy, adenology, adenoma, adenomyosis, adenosis
adip-	fat	Latin	adeps, adipis "fat"	adipocellular, adipose
aer- (ΑΕΡ)	lift, raise	Greek	ἀείρειν (aeírein), ἀορτή (aortḗ), αἰρόμενον, ἀϝείρω	aorta, aortic, endaortitis, meteor, meteorology
aer-, aero-	air, atmosphere	Greek	ἀήρ, ἀέρος (aḗr, aéros) "air"	aerobic, aerodynamic, aeronautics, aeroplane, aerorrhachia, aerosol, aerotitis
aesth-	feeling, sensation	Greek	αἰσθητός (aisthētós), αἰσθητικός (aisthētikós) "of sense perception" from αἰσθάνεσθαι (aisthánesthai) "to perceive"	aesthesia, aesthesis, aesthete, aesthetics, anaesthetic, synesthesia
aether-, ether-	upper pure, bright air	Greek	αἴθειν (aíthein), αἰθήρ (aithḗr)	ether, ethereal, etheric, hypaethros
aev-, ev-	age	Latin	aevum	age, coeval, eon, eternal, longevity, medieval, primeval
ag-, -ig-, act-	do, go, move	Latin	agere, actus	act, action, activation, activity, actor, agenda, agent, agile, agitate, ambiguous, castigate, cogent, cogitate, cogitation, deactivate, excogitate, mitigate, navigate, proactive, react, transaction
ag-	lead	Greek	ἄγειν (ágein) (cognate with Latin agere), ἀγωγός (agōgós)	agony, antagonist, antagonize, demagogue, pedagogue, pedagogy, strategy, synagogue
agap-	love	Greek	ἀγάπη (agápē)	agape
agr-	field	Greek	ἀγρός, ἀγροῦ (agrós, agroû)	agronomist, agronomy
agri-, -egri-	field	Latin	ager, agris "field, country"	agriculture, peregrine
ailur-	cat	Greek	αἴλουρος (aílouros)	Ailuroedus, ailuromancy, ailurophile, ailurophilia, ailurophobia
alac-	cheerful	Latin	alacer	alacrity, allegro
alb-	dull white	Latin	albus	albedo, albino, albumen
alcyon-	kingfisher	Greek	ἀλκυών, ἀλκυόνος (alkuṓn, alkuónos)	Halcyon, halcyon
ale- (ΑΛ)	wheat flour	Greek	ἀλέω, ἄλευρον (áleuron), ἀλείατα	aleuromancy, aleurone, aleuronic
alg-	pain	Greek	ἄλγος (álgos), ἀλγεινός, ἀλγεῖν (algeîn), ἄλγησις (álgēsis)	analgesic, arthralgia, neuralgia, nostalgia
ali-, alter-	other	Latin	alius "another", alter "other"	alias, alibi, alien, alter, alternate, altruism
all-	other	Greek	ἄλλος (állos)	allegory, allogenic, allograph, allophone, parallactic, parallax
allel-	one another	Greek	ἀλλήλων (allḗlōn)	allele, allelomorph, allelotaxis, parallel, parallelism, parallelogon, parallelogram
alph-	A, a	Greek	Α, α, ἄλφα (álpha)	alphabet, alphabetic, analphabetic, panalphabetic, polyalphabetic
alphit-	barley	Greek	ἀλφός (alphós), ἄλφιτον, ἀλφίτου (álphiton, alphítou)	alphitomancy
alt-	high, deep	Latin	altus, altitudo	altimeter, altitude, alto, altocumulus, contralto, exalt
am-, amat-	love, liking	Latin	amāre, amatus, amor	amateur, amatory, amenity, amorous, enamoured
am-, amic-, -imic-	friend	Latin	amicus	amiable, amicable, amity, enemy, enmity, inimical
amath-	sand	Greek	ἄμαθος (amathos)	amathophobia
ambi-, am-, amb-, ambo-, an-	both, on both sides	Latin	ambi	ambidexterity, ambient, ambiguous, ambit, ambition, ambivalent, amboceptor, amputation, ancipital, andante
ambly-	blunt, not sharp, dull	Greek	ἀμβλύς (amblús)	amblygeustia, amblygonite, amblyopia, Amblypoda
ambul-	walk	Latin	ambulare	ambulance, ambulatory, amble, perambulate, preamble, somnambulist
amm-	sand	Greek	ἄμμος (ámmos), ἄμαθος (ámathos)	amathophobia, Ammophila (a plant genus and a wasp genus)
amn-	lamb	Greek	ἀμνός (amnós), ἀμνεῖος, ἀμνειός, ἀμνίον (amníon)	amniocentesis, amnion, amnioscope, amniote, amniotic, anamniote
amph-, amphi-	both, on both sides of, both kinds	Greek	ἀμφί (amphí) "on both sides"	amphibian, amphibious, amphibole, amphibolic, amphimacer, Amphipoda, amphistyly, amphitheatre, amphoterism
ampl-	ample, abundant, bountiful, large	Latin	amplus	ample, amplify, amplitude
amygdal-	almond	Greek	ἀμυγδάλη (amugdálē), ἀμύγδαλον (amúgdalon)	almond, amygdala, amygdale, amygdalin, amygdaloid, amygdule
an-, a-, am-, ar-	not, without	Greek	Greek ἀν-/ἀ- "not"	ambrosia, anaerobic, anarchy, anemia, anesthesia, anhydrous, anonymous, apathy, aphasia, arrhythmia, atheism, atypical
ana-, am-, an-	again, against, back, up	Greek	ἀνά (aná)	anagram, anabaptist, anaphylaxis, anarrhexis, anion, anode
andr- (ΑΝΕΡ)	male, masculine	Greek	ἀνήρ, ἀνδρός (anḗr, andrós), ἀνδρότης	Andrew, Alexander, androcentric, androcentrism, androgen, androgenous, androgyne, androgynous, androgyny, android, andrology, androphobia, androspore, diandry, misandry, monandry, philander, polyandrous, polyandry, protandry, pseudandry, synandrous
anem- (ΑΝ)	wind	Greek	ἄνεμος (ánemos)	anemograph, anemometer, anemometric, anemone, anemophilous, anemophily, anemophobia, anemoscope, anemotropism
anim-	breath, life, soul, spirit	Latin	anima "breath", "soul"	animal, animation, anime, animism, animus, inanimate, equanimity
ann-, -enn-	year, yearly	Latin	annus "year"	anniversary, annual, centennial, millennium, perennial
ant-, anti-	against, opposed to, preventive	Greek	ἀντί (antí) "against"	antagonist, antagonize, antibiotic, antibody, antichrist, antidepressant antidote, antifreeze, antifungal, antigen, antinomies, antipathy, antipodes, antirrhinum, antiseptic, antisocial, antithesis
ante-, anti-	before, in front of, prior to; old	Latin	ante "before", "against"; see also antiquus "old"	antebellum, antecedent, antedate, antediluvian, anteroom, anticipate, antiquarian, antiquate, antique, antiquity
anth-	flower	Greek	ἀνθεῖν (antheîn), ἄνθος (ánthos), ἄνθησις (ánthēsis), ἄνθημα (ánthēma), ἀνθηρός (anthērós)	anther, anthesis, Anthocoridae, anthodite, anthology, anthophobia, anthophore, Anthozoa, chrysanthemum, dianthus, enanthem, enanthema, exanthem, exanthematic, hydranth, hypanthium, perianth, zoanthid
anthrac-	coal	Greek	ἄνθραξ, ἄνθρακος (ánthrax, ánthrakos)	anthracite, anthracnose, anthracycline, anthrax
anthrop-	human	Greek	ἄνθρωπος (ánthrōpos) "man"	anthropology, anthroposophy, anthropomorphic, misanthrope, philanthropy
ap-, apo-	off, away from, separate, at the farthest point	Greek	ἀπό (apó) "from, away, un-, quite", sometimes "changed, switched"	aphelion, apocrine, apocryphal, apogee, aporrhinosis, apostasy, apostate
aper-	open	Latin	aperire	aperient, apéritif, aperitive, aperture, overt, overture, pert
aphrod-	Aphrodite	Greek	Ἀφροδίτη (Aphrodítē), Ἀφροδίσιος (Aphrodísios), ἀφροδισιακόν (aphrodisiakón)	aphrodisiac, pseudohermaphroditism
api-	bee	Latin	apis	apian, apiary, apicula, apium; Petrus Apianus
aqu-	water	Latin	aqua	acquacotta, akvavit, aqua vitae, aquaculture, aquamarine, aquarelle, aquarium, Aquarius, aquatic, aquatile, aqueduct, aqueous, aquifer, aquiferous, aquiform, gouache, semiaquatic
ara-	plow, till	Latin	ărāre	arability, arable, aration, aratory, exarate, exaration, inarable, nonarable
arachn-	spider	Greek	ἀράχνης, ἀράχνη (arákhnē)	Arachne, arachnid, arachnodactyly, arachnoid, arachnology, arachnophobia
arbit-	judge	Latin	arbiter (from ad "to" + baetere "to come, go")	arbiter, arbitrage, arbitrary, arbitration
arcan-	box	Latin	arcanus	arcane, arcanum
arch-, arche-, archi-	ruler	Greek	ἄρχειν (árkhein), ἄρχων (árkhōn), ἀρχή (arkhḗ) "rule" (in compounds: ἀρχε-, ἀρχι-)	anarchism, anarchist, anarchy, andrarchy, antarchy, archangel, archetype, architect, archon, autarch, autarchism, autarchy, eparch, eparchy, exarch, gynarchy, monarch, monarchism, monarchist, monarchy, navarch, octarchy, oligarchy, patriarchy, plutarchy, polyarchy, synarchism, synarchy, tetrarchy, triarchy, trierarch
archae-, arche-	ancient	Greek	ἀρχαῖος (arkhaîos) "ancient" from ἀρχή (arkhḗ) "rule"	Archaea, archaeoastronomy, archaeology, archaic, archaism, archegonium, archeology
arct-	Relating to the North Pole or the region near it; relating to cold	Greek	ἄρκτος (árktos) "bear", ἀρκτικός (arktikós)	Antarctic, arctic, Arctic Ocean, palearctic
ard-	heat, glow, passion	Latin	ardere "to burn", arsus	ardent, ardor, arson
ardu-	difficult	Latin	arduus "high, steep"	arduous
aret-	virtue	Greek	ἀρετή, ἀρετῆς (aretḗ, aretês)	aretaic, arete
argent-	silver	Latin	argentum	argent, Argentina
arid-	be dry	Latin	ārēre "be dry or parched"	arid
arist-	excellence	Greek	ἄριστος (áristos)	aristocracy, aristocrat
arithm-	count, number	Greek	ἀριθμός (arithmós), ἀριθμέω, ἀριθμητικός (arithmētikós)	antilogarithm, arithmetic, arithmomania, logarithm, logarithmic
arm-	weapon	Latin	arma	armament, armistice, armor, armory, arms, army, disarm, rearm
arsen-	male	Greek	ἄρσην, ἄρσενος (ársēn, ársenos), ἀρσενικός (arsenikós)	arsenic, arsenopyrite
art-	art, skill	Latin	ars, artis	artifact, artifice, artificial, artificiality, artisan
arthr-	joint	Greek	ἄρθρον (árthron)	Anarthria, arthritic, arthritis, arthrogryposis, arthropathy, arthroplasty, arthropod, arthroscope, arthroscopic, arthroscopy, arthrosis, dysarthria, osteoarthritis, spondyloarthropathy
arti-	even	Greek	ἄρτιος (ártios), ἀρτιότης "evenness", ἀρτιάκις	artiodactyl, artiodactylous
asc-	bag	Greek	ἀσκός (askós), ἀσκίδιον (askídion)	ascidium, ascites, ascitic, ascocarp, ascoma, ascomycete, Ascomycota, ascospore, ascus
asin-	donkey, ass	Latin	asinus	asinine, ass, easel
asper-	rough	Latin	asper "rough"	asperity, exasperate
aspr-	white	Greek	ἄσπρος (áspros)	diaper
aster-, astr-	star, star-shaped	Greek	ἀστήρ, ἀστέρος (astḗr, astéros), ἄστρον (ástron) "star"	aster, asterisk, asteroid, astrology, astronomy, astronaut, diasterism geaster, monaster
asthen-	weak	Greek	ἀσθενής (asthenḗs)	asthenopia, asthenosphere, asthenozoospermia
ather-	gruel	Greek	ἀθάρη (athárē)	atherogenic, atheroma, atherosclerosis
athl-	contest	Greek	ἆθλος (âthlos) "contest, feat", ἄεθλος	athlete, athletic, decathlon, pentathlon, triathlon
-athroid-	gathered or lumped together	Greek	ἀθροίζειν (athroízein) "to gather together"	epiathroid, hypoathroid
audac-	daring	Latin	audax "brave, bold, daring", from audere "to dare"	audacious, audacity
aud-	hearing, listening, sound	Latin	audire "to hear"	audible, audience, audio, audiobook, audiology, audiovisual, audit, audition, auditorium, auditory
aug-, auct-	grow, increase	Latin	augēre, auctus "to increase"	auction, augend, augment, augmentation, augur, augury, august, author, auxiliary, inauguration
aul-	flute, tube	Greek	ἄημι (ἄϝημι), αὐλός (aulós), αὐλέω, αὔλησις, αὐλητής (aulētḗs)	aulete, aulos, hydraulic, hydraulus
aur-	relating to gold, or gold-colored	Latin	aurum "gold"	aureate, aureole
auri-, aus-	relating to the ear	Latin	auris "ear"	aural, auricle, aurinasal, auscultate, auscultation
aut-, auto-	self; directed from within	Greek	αὐτός (autós) "self", "same"	autarchism, autarchy, autarky, authentic, autism, autistic, autobiography, autocracy, autograph, autoimmune, automatic, automaton, automobile, autonomy, autopilot
aux-	increase	Greek	αὔξειν (aúxein), αὐξάνειν auxánein, αὔξησις (aúxēsis), αὐξητικός (auxētikós)	auxanogram, auxanography, auxanology, auxanometer, auxesis, auxetic, auxin, auxochrome, auxology, auxotroph, auxotrophy
av-	desire	Latin	avere "crave, long for"	avarice, avaricious, avarous, ave, avid, avidity
avi-, au-	bird	Latin	avis	auspice, auspicious, avian, aviary, aviation, aviator
axi-	merit, worth	Greek	ἄξιος (áxios) "worth"	axiology, axiom, axiomatic
axi-	axis	Latin	axis	axion, axis, axisymmetry
axon-	axis, axle	Greek	ἄξων, ἄξονος (áxōn, áxonos)	axon, axonography, axonometric, axonotmesis

Lists of Greek and Latin roots in English beginning with other letters:
- A
- B
- C
- D
- E
- F
- G
- H
- I
- J
- K
- L
- M
- N
- O
- P
- Q
- R
- S
- T
- U
- V
- X
- Z

== B ==
Root	Meaning in English	Origin language	Etymology (root origin)	English examples
ba- (ΒΑ)	to step	Greek	βαίνειν (baínein), βατός (batós), βάσις (básis), βῆμα, βήματος (bêma, bḗmatos), βάτης (bátēs), βάθρον (báthron), βατεῖν	acrobat, acrobatic, adiabatic, aerobatic, anabasis, anabatic, antiparabema, base, basic, basidiocarp, basidioma, basidiomycete, basidiospore, basidium, basion, basionym, basis, basophilic, bema, catabasis, catabatic, diabase, diabatic, diabetes, diabetic, dibasic, hyperbaton, hypobasis, katabasis, katabatic, monobasic, polybasic, stereobate, stylobate, tribasic
bac-	rod-shaped	Latin	baculum	baculiform, baculum, bacteria
bal-, bel-, bol- (ΒΑΛ)	throw	Greek	βάλλειν (bállein), βολή (bolḗ), βλῆμα (blêma)	ametabolic, ametabolism, amphibole, amphibolic, amphibolite, amphibolous, amphiboly, anabolic, anabolism, astrobleme, ball, ballism, ballista, ballistic, ballistospore, belomancy, belonephobia, bolide, bolometer, catabolic, catabolism, devil, diabolic, emblem, emblematic, embolic, embolism, embolismic, embolize, embolon, embolus, emboly, hemiballismus, holometabolism, hyperbola, hyperbole, hyperbolic, hyperboloid, metabolic, metabolism, metabolite, metabolize, palaver, parable, parabola, parabolic, paraboloid, parle, parley, parol, parole, problem, problematic, symbol, symbolic, symbolism, symbolist, symbolize, symbology, taurobolium, thromboembolism
bapt- (ΒΑΦ)	dip	Greek	βάπτειν (báptein), βάμμα (bámma)	abaptiston, Anabaptist, baptism, baptize
bar-	weight, pressure	Greek	βαρύς (barús), βάρος (báros)	abarognosis, antibaryon, baresthesia, bariatric, baritone, barognosis, barogram, barograph, barometer, barometric, barophobia, barostat, barycentre, barycentric, baryogenesis, baryon, barysphere, baryton, barytone, hyperbaric, hypobaric, isobar, isobaric
bas-	step	Greek	βάσις	
bath-	deep, depth	Greek	βαθύς (bathús), βάθος (báthos)	batholith, bathophobia, bathos, bathymetry, bathyscaphe, bathysphere, isobathic
be-, beat-	bless	Latin	beare, beatus	beatification
bell-, belli-	war	Latin	bellum, belli	antebellum, bellicose, belligerent, rebellion
ben-	good, well	Latin	bene (adverb)	beneficence, benefit, benevolent, benign, benignant, benignity
bet-	B, b	Greek	beta	alphabet, alphabetic, analphabetic, panalphabetic, polyalphabetic
bi-, bin-, bis-	two	Latin	bis, "twice"; bini, "in twos"	bicycle, biennial, bifocal, bisexual, bigamy, binary, binoculars, bipod bipolar biscotti
bib-	drink	Latin	bibere, bibitus	bib, beer, beverage, imbibe
bibl-	book	Greek	βίβλος (bíblos), βιβλίον (biblíon) "book"	bible, biblioclasm, biblioclast, bibliogony, bibliographic, bibliography, biblioklept, bibliomancy, bibliomania, bibliophile, bibliophilia, bibliophobe, bibliophobia, bibliotaph
bio-, bi-	life	Greek	βιοῦν (bioûn), βίος (bíos) "life", βιωτός (biōtós), βιωτικός (biōtikós), βίωσις (bíōsis)	abiogenesis, abiotic, aerobiology, anhydrobiosis, anoxybiosis, antibiotic, astrobiology, autobiography, biocentrism, biochron, biocoenosis, biogenesis, biographic, biography, biologism, biologist, biology, biome, biometric, biomorph, biomorphism, biophilia, biophysicist, biophysics, biopoiesis, biopolymer, biopsy, biorhythm, biosemiotic, biosphere, biostasis, biosynthesis, biota, biotic, biotin, biotope, biotype, biozone, chemobiosis, cryobiosis, cryptobiosis, ectosymbiosis, endosymbiont, endosymbiosis, enterobiasis, exobiology, macrobiotic, microbiology, osmobiosis, probiotic, symbiogenesis, symbiology, symbiont, symbiosis, symbiotic
blast-	germ, embryo, bud, cell with nucleus	Greek	βλαστάνειν (blastánein), "to sprout, bud", βλαστός (blastós), βλάστημα (blástēma)	blastema, blastochyle, blastocoel, blastocoele, blastocyst, blastoderm, blastoma, blastula, cytotrophoblast, diploblasty, ectoblast, endoblast, entoblast, fibroblast, osteoblast, sideroblast
blenn-	slime	Greek	βλέννος (blénnos)	blennadenitis, blennophobia, blennosperma, blennorrhagia
bol-	throw	Greek		
bol-	clod, lump	Greek	βῶλος (bôlos)	bole, bolus, embolism
bomb-	boom	Greek	βομβεῖν, βόμβος, βόμβησις	bomb, bound
bon-	good	Latin	bonus	bonify, bonitary
bore-	north	Latin from Greek	borealis "northern" from Βορέας (Boréas) "the north wind"	borealis
botan-	plant	Greek	βοτάνη, βότανον (botánē, bótanon), βοτανικός	botanic, botanist, botanology, botany
bov-, bu-	cow, ox	Latin	bos (genitive bovis) "ox, cow"	beef, boor, bovine, bucinator muscle
brachi-, brachio-	arm	Latin from Greek	bracchium	brachiferous, brachial artery, brachiocubital
brachi-, brachio-, brachion-, brachioni-	arm	Greek	βραχίων (brakhíōn)	brachialgia, brachionerysipelas, brachionigraph, brachiorrhachidian, Brachiosaurus
brachy-	short	Greek	βραχύς (brakhús)	amphibrach, brachistochrone, brachycephaly, brachydactyly, brachyury, dibrach, tribrach
brady-, bradys-	slow	Greek	βραδύς (bradús), βράδος (brádos)	bradycardia, bradysuria, bradytelic
branchi-	gill	Greek	βράγχιον (bránkhion)	branchiopneustic, branchiopod, nudibranch
broc-	rain, wet	Greek	ἐμβροχή (embrokhḗ)	embrocation, embrocate
brev-	brief, short (time)	Latin	brevis, breviare	abbreviate, brevextensor, brevicaudate, brevity, brief
bromat-, bromato-, broma-, bromo-	food	Greek	βρῶμα (brôma)	bromatium, bromateccrisis, bromatherapy, bromatology, bromography
brom-	oats	Greek	βρόμος, βρόμη (brómos, brómē) "oats"	brome, Bromus, Bromus ramosus
brom-	stench	Greek	βρῶμος (brômos) "stench, clangor"	bromate, bromide, bromine, bromoderma, organobromine
bronch-	windpipe	Greek	βρόγχος (brónkhos), βρόγχια (brónkhia)	bronchia, bronchiole, bronchion, bronchitis, bronchomalacia, bronchopneumonia, bronchus, tracheobronchomalacia
bront-	thunder	Greek	βροντή (brontḗ)	brontology, brontophobia, Brontosaurus
brot-	mortal	Greek	βροτός (brotós)	ambrosia, ambrotype
bucc-	cheek, mouth, cavity	Latin	bucca	buccal, buccilingual, buccolingual
bulb-	bulbous	Latin	bulbus	bulbiform, bulbiparous, bulboartrial, bulborrhexis, bulbous, bulbule
bull-	bubble, flask	Latin	bullire, bulla	bullectomy, bulliferous, ebullient, ebullism
burs-	pouch, purse	Latin	bursa	bursa, bursalogy, bursar, bursary, bursectomy, bursiform, disburse
butyr-	butter	Greek	βούτυρον (boúturon)	butyric
byss-	bottom	Greek	βυσσός, βυσσοῦ (bussós, bussoû)	abyss, abyssopelagic, hypabyssal
byss-	flax	Greek	βύσσος (bússos)	byssus

Lists of Greek and Latin roots in English beginning with other letters:
- A
- B
- C
- D
- E
- F
- G
- H
- I
- J
- K
- L
- M
- N
- O
- P
- Q
- R
- S
- T
- U
- V
- X
- Z

== C ==
Root	Meaning in English	Origin language	Etymology (root origin)	English examples
cac-, kak-	bad	Greek	κακός (kakós), κάκιστος (kákistos)	cachexia, cacistocracy, cacodemon, cacoepy, cacography, cacophobia, cacophobe, cacophobic, cacophonous, cacophony, cacorrhacitis, kakistocracy, kakistocrat
cad-, -cid-, cas-	fall	Latin	cadere, casus	accidence, accident, accidental, cadaver, cadaverine, cadaverous, cadence, cadency, cadent, cadential, cadenza, caducity, caducous, cascade, case, casual, casualty, casuistry, chance, cheat, chute, coincide, coincidence, coincident, coincidental, decadence, decadent, decay, decidua, decidual, deciduate, deciduation, deciduous, demicadence, escheat, escheatable, escheatage, escheatment, escheator, incidence, incident, incidental, nonaccidental, nondeciduous, nonincidental, parachute, postaccident, procidentia, recidivous, semelincident
caed-, -cid-, caes-, -cis-	cut, kill	Latin	caedere, caesus	caespitose, caesura, cement, cementation, cementitious, cementum, cespitose, chisel, circumcise, circumcision, concise, concision, decidability, decidable, decide, decision, decisive, deciso, excide, excise, excision, excisional, fungicide germicide, genocide, herbicide homicide, imprecise, imprecision, incise, incision, incisive, incisor, incisory, incisure, indecision, indecisive, occision, pesticide, précis, precise, precision, scissors, semidecidable, succise, succision, suicide
cal-, call-	beautiful	Greek	καλός (kalós) "beautiful"; κάλλος (kállos) "beauty", κάλλιστος (kállistos)	calisthenics, calligraphy, Callista, Callisto, calophyllous, kaleidoscope
cal-	call	Latin	calare	calendar, claim, class, conciliate, conciliatory, council, intercalate, nomenclature
cal-	heat	Latin	calere, calor "heat"	caldarium, caldera, calefacient, calefaction, calefactive, calefactory, calenture, calescent, calid, calor, calore, caloric, calorie, calorifacient, calorific, calorigenic, calorimeter, caudle, cauldron, chafe, chafery, chalder, chaldron, chaud-froid, chauffer, chauffeur, chauffeuse, decalescence, decalescent, nonchalance, nonchalant, recalescence, scald
calc-	calcium, stone	Latin and Greek	from Latin calx (genitive calcis) "lime", from Greek χάλιξ (khálix) "pebble", "limestone"	calcite, calcitrant, calcium, calculate, calculus, chalicothere, chalk, recalcitrant
calv-, calum-	trick, lie, deceive	Latin	calumnia "slander, trickery", from calvi "to trick, deceive"	calumnious, calumny, cavil, challenge
calyp-	cover	Greek	καλύπτειν (kalúptein), καλυπτός (kaluptós), κάλυξ, κάλυκος (kálux, kálukos)	apocalypse, apocalyptic, apocalypticism, calyce, calyptra, Calyptrogyne, calyx, epicalyx, eucalypt, eucalyptus
cameria-	vault	Latin	camera	antechamber, bicameral, camaraderie, camber, camera, chamber, chamberlain, comrade, concamerate, concameration, multicamera, tricameral, unicameral
camiso-	shirt	Latin	camisia	camisade, camisado, Camisard, camisole, chemise
camp-	field	Latin	campus "field", "level ground"	camp, campaign, campesino, campestral, campicolous, campimetry, campo, campsite, campus, champertous, champerty, champignon, champion, decamp, decampment, encamp, encampment
can-	dog	Latin	canis	canaille, canary, canicular, canicule, canid, canine, Canis, Canis Major, postcanine
can-	reed, rod	Greek	κάννα (kánna), κανών (kanṓn)	cane, canister, canon, canonic
can-, -cin-, cant-, -cent-	sing	Latin	canere, cantus	accent, accentual, accentuate, accentuation, canción, canorous, cant, cantabile, cantata, cantation, cantatory, cantatrice, canticle, canticum, cantiga, cantilena, cantillate, cantillation, cantion, canto, cantor, cantus, canzona, canzone, Carmen, chanson, chansonnier, chant, chanteur, chanteuse, chanticleer, charm, concent, descant, discant, discantus, disenchant, disenchantment, disencharm, disincentive, enchant, enchantment, enchantress, incantation, incantational, incentive, plainchant, precentor, recant, recantation, succentor, vaticinate, vaticination, vaticinator
cand-, cend-	glowing, iridescent	Latin	candere "to be white or glisten"	candela, candid, candidate, candle, candor, incandescent, incendiary, incense
cap-, -cip-, capt-, -cept-	hold, take	Latin	capere, captus "take or hold" (vowel changes from a to i in compounds)	capable, capacious, captive, caption, captivate, capture, conception, except, forceps, incipient, intercept, recipient
capit-, -cipit-	head	Latin	caput, capitis	achievable, achieve, achievement, ancipital, ancipitous, biceps, bicipital, cabotage, cad, caddie, cadet, cape, capital, capitular, capitulate, capitulation, captain, chapter, chaptrel, chattel, chef, chief, chieftain, co-captain, co-captaincy, decapitate, decapitation, occipital, occiput, precipitation, precipitous, quadriceps, recap, recapitulate, sincipital, sinciput, sous-chef, subcaptain, triceps, tricipital, unicipital, vice-captain, vice-captaincy
capn-	smoke	Greek	καπνός (kapnós), καπνόομαι	capnogram, capnograph, capnography, capnolagnia, capnomancy, capnometer, capnometry, capnomor, capnophile, hypercapnia, hypocapnia
capr-	goat	Latin	caper (genitive capri) "goat", also capreolus "wild goat"	cab, caper, caprice, Capricorn, caprine
caps-	box, case	Latin	capsa	capsule
carbon-	coal	Latin	carbo, carbonis	bicarbonate, carbon, carbonara, carbonate, carbonation, Carboniferous, carbuncle, radiocarbon
carcer-	jail	Latin	carcer, carcerare, cancelli	chancel, chancellery, chancellor, chancery, incarcerate, incarceration, subchancel
carcin-	cancer (disease)	Latin from Greek	Latin from Greek καρκίνος (karkínos) "crab"	carcinogenic, carcinoma
cardi-	heart	Greek	καρδιά (kardiá)	cardiac, cardialgia, cardiograph, cardioid, cardiologist, cardiology, cardiomegaly, cardiomyopathy, cardioplegia, cardioplegic, cardiospasm, electrocardiogram, electrocardiography, endocardium, epicardium, hemicardia, myocardium, neurocardiology, pericardium
cardin-	hinge	Latin	cardo, cardinis	cardinal, cardinality, kern
carn-	flesh	Latin	caro, carnis	carnage, carnal, carnality, carnary, carnate, carnation, carneous, carnival, carnivore, carnose, carnosity, carrion, caruncle, carunculate, charcuterie, charnel, discarnate, incarnadine, incarnate, incarnation, reincarnate, reincarnation
carp-	fruit	Greek	καρπός (karpós)	acarpous, acrocarpous, amphicarpous, angiocarpous, anisocarpic, Carpo, carpogonium, carpology, carpophagous, carpophore, carpospore, cystocarp, dipterocarp, endocarp, epicarp, exocarp, Karpos, mericarp, mesocarp, monocarpic, pericarp, polycarpic, procarp, pseudocarp
carp-	wrist	Greek	καρπός (karpós)	carpal, carpal tunnel syndrome, carpus, metacarpus
cast-	pure, cut	Latin	castrare and castus, from kes- (to cut)	caste, castigate, castrate, chaste, chastity, incest
cata-, cat-	down, against, back	Greek	κατά (katá) "down, against, back"	catabolic, catacomb, catalyst, catarrhine, catastrophe, catatonia, cathode, cation
caten-	chain	Latin	catena	catenary, concatenation
cathar-	pure	Greek	καθαρός (katharós)	catharsis, cathartic
caud-	tail	Latin	cauda	caudal, coda
caus-, -cus-	cause or motive	Latin	causa	accuse, because, causal, causative, cause, excuse
caust-, caut-	burn	Greek	καίειν (kaíein), καυστός, καυτός (kaustós, kautós), καυστικός (kaustikós), καῦσις (kaûsis), καῦμα (kaûma)	calm, catacaustic, causalgia, causalgic, caustic, cauter, cauterize, cautery, diacaustic, encaustic, holocaust, hypocaust
cav-	hollow	Latin	cavus	cave, cavity, excavation, cavern, cavernous, concave
ced-, cess-	move, yield, go, surrender	Latin	cedere, cessus	accede, cede, concede, precede, procedure, proceed, procession, recede, secede, succeed, success
cel-	hide	Latin	celare "to hide"	ceiling, clandestine, conceal, occult
celer-	quick	Latin	celer, celerare	acceleration, celerity
cen-, caen-	new	Greek	καινός (kainós)	caenogastropod, caenogenesis, Cenozoic
cen-	empty	Greek	κενός (kenós)	cenotaph, kenosis
cen-, coen-	common	Greek	κοινός (koinós)	cenobite, coenesthesia, coenocyte, epicene, epicœne, koinonos, koinophilia
cens-	to assess	Latin	censere	censure, census
cent-	hundred	Latin	centum	cent, centennial, centurion, percent, century
centen-	hundred each	Latin	centeni	centenarian, centenary
centesim-	hundredth	Latin	centesimus	centesimal, centesimation
centr-	center	Greek	κεντεῖν, κέντησις, κέντρον (kéntron) "needle", "spur", κεντρικός, κεντρισμός	acentric, acrocentric, amniocentesis, anthropocentric, anthropocentrism, barycenter, biocentric, biocentrism, centaur, centauromachy, centesis, centre, centric, centrism, centrist, centroid, centromere, centromeric, centrosphere, centrosymmetric, centrosymmetry, centrum, eccentric, eccentrism, eccentrist, ecocentric, ecocentrism, ecocentrist, egocentric, egocentrism, enterocentesis, epicentre, holocentric, metacentric, monocentric, neocentromere, orthocenter, orthocentric, paracentesis, pericardiocentesis, technocentric, technocentrism, telocentric, thoracentesis, thoracocentesis
centri-	center	Latin	centrum	central, center, concentrate, concentric, centrifugal, centripetal
cephal-	head	Greek	κεφαλή (kephalḗ)	acephalic, acephaly, anencephaly, autocephaly, brachiocephalic, brachycephalic, cephalic, cephalomancy, cephalometry, cephalon, cephalopagus, cephalopod, diencephalon, dolichocephalic, encephalitis, encephalogram, encephalopathy, holoprosencephaly, hydrocephalus, macrocephaly, mesaticephalic, mesencephalic, mesocephalic, metencephalon, microcephaly, myelencephalon, neencephalon, paleencephalon, prosencephalon, rhombencephalon, rhombencephalosynapsis, syncephalus, telencephalon
ceram-	clay	Greek	κέραμος (kéramos)	ceramic
cerat-	horn	Greek	κέρας (kéras), κέρατος (kératos)	keratin, Triceratops
cern-, cer-	sift	Latin	cernere "to sift, separate"	ascertain, certain, concern, concert, decree, discern, excrement, secern, secret
cervic-	relating to the neck, relating to the cervix	Latin	cervix, cervicis "neck"	cervix, cervical
ceter-	other	Latin	ceterus	et cetera
chaet-	hair, bristle, or seta	Greek	χαίτη (khaítē) "long hair"	chaetophobia, chaetophorous, Chaetomium, Chaetomorpha, Oligochaeta, Polychaeta, polychaete, spirochaete, spirochete
chir-	of the hand or hands	Greek	χείρ (kheír) "hand"	chiral, chiropractic, Chiroptera, chirurgy, enchiridion, Haplocheirus
chelon-	relating to a turtle	Greek	χελώνη (khelṓnē) "tortoise"	Archelon, chelonia
chlor-	green	Greek	χλωρός (khlōrós)	chloranthy, chlorine, chlorophobia, chlorophyll, chloroplast, pyrochlore
chondr-	cartilage	Greek	χόνδρος (khóndros)	hypochondriasis, osteochondritis
chore-	relating to dance	Greek	χορεία (khoreía) "dancing in unison" from χορός (khorós) "chorus"	chorea, choree, choreia, choreography, chorus, hemichorea
chord-	cord	Latin and Greek	chorda "rope" from χορδή (khordḗ)	Chordata, cord, hexachord, monochord, polychord, tetrachord
chres-	use	Greek	χράω, χρῆσθαι (khrêsthai), χρηστός (khrēstós), χρήστης, χρῆσις (khrêsis), χρήσιμος	chresard, chresonym, chrestomathic, chrestomathy, heterochresonym, heterochresonymy, orthochresonym, orthochresonymy
chro-, chrom-	color	Greek	χρῶμα (khrôma)	achromat, achromatic, achromatism, achromatopsia, achromatopsic, amphichroic, apochromat, auxochrome, chroma, chromatic, chromatid, chromatophore, chrome, chromium, chromogen, chromolithography, chromophobia, chromophore, chromosome, dichroic, dichroism, dichromatic, heliochrome, heterochromatic, heterochromatin, microchromosome, monochromatic, monochrome, photochromism, pleochroism, polychromatic, polychrome, trichroism, trichromatic, trichromic
chron-	time	Greek	χρόνος (khrónos)	anachronism, asynchronous, biochronology, chronaxie, chronic, chronicle, chronogram, chronograph, chronology, chronometer, chronometry, chronophobia, chronophotography, chronostasis, geochronology, heterochrony, hydrochronometer, isochron, protochronism, synchronic, synchronism, synchronize, synchronous, tautochrone
chrys-	gold	Greek	χρυσός (khrusós), χρύσεος "golden"	chrysalis, chryselephantine, chrysolite, chrysophobia, chrysoprase
cili-	eyelash	Latin	cilium	cilia, supercilious
ciner-	ash	Latin	cinis, cineris	incineration
cing-, cinct-	gird	Latin	cingere, cinctus	succinct
circ-	circle, ring	Latin	circulus, circus	circle, circular, circulate, circus
circum-	around	Latin	circum	circumcise, circumference, circumlocution, circumnavigate, circumscribe
cirr-	orange	Greek	κιρρός (kirrhós)	cirrhosis
cirr-	curl, tentacle	Latin	cirrus	cirrus
cis-	on this side of, on the side nearer to the speaker (as opposed to trans-)	Latin	cis	cisalpine, cisandine, cisatlantic, cisgangetic, cisgender, cisjurane, cisleithan, cislunar, cismontane, cispadane, cispontine, cisrhenane
cit-	call, start	Latin	citare, frequentative of ciere	citation, cite, excite, incite, solicit, solicitous
civ-	citizen	Latin	civis	civic, civil, civilian, civility, civilization
clad-	branch	Greek	κλάδος (kládos)	clade, cladistics, cladogenesis, cladogram, heterocladic
clam-	cry out	Latin	clamare	acclaim, claim, clamor, exclamation, proclamation, reclamation
clar-	clear	Latin	clarus, clarare	clarity, clear, declaration
clast-	broken	Greek	κλᾶν, κλαστός (klastós), κλάσις, κλάσμα	anorthoclase, antanaclasis, clastic, iconoclast, orthoclase, osteoclast, plagioclase, pyroclastic, synclastic
claud-, -clud-, claus-, -clus-	close, shut	Latin	claudere, clausus	clause, claustrophobia, conclude, exclude, exclusive, include, occlusion, occult, recluse, seclude
clav-	key	Greek	κλείς (kleís) "key" from κλείειν, (kleíein) "to close"	clavichord, clavicle, conclave
cleist-	closed	Greek	κλείειν, κλειστός (kleistós), κλεῖσμα	cleistogamy, cleistothecium, enterocleisis, kleisma
cleithr-	bar, key	Greek	κλεῖθρον (kleîthron)	Clathrus, cleithrophobia, cleithrum
cle-	call	Greek	ἐκκλησίᾱ, κλῆσις, κλητός (ekklēsíā, klêsis, klētós)	ecclesia, Ecclesiastes, ecclesiastic, ecclesiology, ecclesiophobia, epiclesis, paraclete
clin-	bed	Greek	κλίνη (klínē)	clinic
clin-	lean, recline	Latin	-clinare	decline, declination, incline, inclination, recline
cochl-	snail, spiral shell	Greek	κόχλος (kókhlos)	cochlea
coel-	hollow	Greek	κοῖλος (koîlos)	blastocoel, coelom, coelomate, coelomic, enterocoely, pseudocoelomate, sarcocele, schizocoelomate, schizocoely, spongocoel
col-	strain	Latin	colare, cōlum	colander, coulee, coulis, coulisse, couloir, cullender, cullis, percolate, percolation, percolator, piña colada, portcullis
col-, cult-	cultivate, till, inhabit	Latin	colere, cultus	acculturate, acculturation, agriculture, apiculture, bicultural, colonial, colony, countercultural, counterculture, cult, cultivable, cultivate, cultivation, cultivator, cultural, culturati, culture, deculturate, deculturation, incult, inculturation, inquiline, inquilinity, inquilinous, intercultural, multicultural, postcolonial, precolonial, subcultural, subculture
coll-	hill	Latin	collis	colliculus
coll-	neck	Latin	collum	accolade, col, collar, decollate, decollation, décolletage, encollar
color-	color	Latin	color	bicolor, Colorado, coloration, coloratura, concolorous, decolor, discolor, discoloration, encolor, multicolor, quadricolor, recolor, tricolor, unicolor, versicolor
com-	friendly, kind	Latin	cōmis "courteous, kind"	comity
con-, co-, col-, com-, cor-	with, together	Latin	cum	coagulate, collide, compress, connect, connote, contain, contribute, consult, constitution, corrode, quondam
con-	cone	Greek	κῶνος (kônos), κωνικός (kōnikós)	conic, conical, conicoid, conodont, conoid, conoscope, orthocone, orthoconic, polyconic
condi-	season	Latin	condire	condiment
contra-	against	Latin	contra	contraband, contraception, contradict, contraindicate, contrast, contravene
copi-	plenty	Latin	copia	copious, copy, cornucopia
copr-	dung	Greek	κόπρος (kópros)	copremia, coprographia, coprolagnia, coprolalia, coprolite, coprolith, coprology, coprophagia, coprophagy, coprophilia, copropraxia, encopresis, encopretic
copul-	bond	Latin	copula "that which binds"	copula, copulation, couple
cor-, cord-	heart	Latin	cor, cordis	accord, accordance, accordant, accordatura, concord, concordance, concordant, concordat, corcle, cordate, cordial, cordiality, cordiform, core, courage, courageous, discord, discordance, discordant, discourage, discouragement, encourage, encouragement, misericord, nonaccordant, obcordate, record, scordatura
corac-	raven	Greek	κόραξ, κόρακος (kórax, kórakos)	coracoid
cori-	hide, leather	Latin	corium, corii	coriaceous, corious, corium, cuirass, cuirassier, cuirie, excoriate, excoriation
corn-	horn	Latin	cornū	bicorn, bicorne, Capricorn, cornea, corneal, corneous, corner, cornicle, corniculate, corniferous, cornification, corniform, cornucopia, quadricorn, quadricornous, tricorn, tricorne, tricornigerous, tricornute, unicorn, unicornous
coron-	crown	Latin	corona, coronare	corona, coronation, coronavirus, coroner, coronet, coroniform, Coronilla, crown, incoronate
corpor-	body	Latin	corpus, corporis	accorporate, bicorporal, concorporate, concorporation, corporal, corporality, corporate, corporation, corporative, corporature, corporeal, corporeality, corporeity, corps, corpse, corpulence, corpulent, corpus, corpuscle, corpuscular, disincorporate, disincorporation, extracorporeal, incorporal, incorporality, incorporate, incorporation, incorporeal, incorporeality, incorporeity, tricorporal
cortic-	bark	Latin	cortex, corticis	cortex, cortical, corticate, corticiform, corticifugal, corticipetal, decorticate, decortication, decorticator
cosm-	universe	Greek	κόσμος (kósmos)	cosmic, cosmogeny, cosmogony, cosmology, cosmonaut, cosmopolitan, cosmopolite, cosmos, microcosm
cosmet-	the art of dress and ornament	Greek	κοσμεῖν (kosmeîn), κοσμητική (kosmētikḗ) from κόσμος (kósmos)	cosmesis, cosmetics, cosmetologist, cosmetology
cost-	rib	Latin	costa	accost, bicostate, coast, coastal, costa, costal, costate, curvicostate, entrecôte, infracostal, intercostal, intracoastal, multicostate, quadricostate, supracostal, tricostate, unicostate
cotyl-	cup	Greek	κοτύλη (kotúlē)	cotyledon, dicotyledon, dicotyledonous, eudicotyledon, monocotyledon, monocotyledonous, tricotyledonous
-cracy, -crat	government, rule, authority	Greek	κράτος (krátos), κρατία (kratía)	acrasia, akrasia, akratic, anocracy, aristocracy, autocracy, autocrat, autocratic, bureaucracy, democracy, democratic, pancratium, plutocracy, technocracy, technocrat, theocracy
crani-	skull	Greek	κρανίον (kraníon)	craniologist, craniometry, craniosynostosis, cranium, hemicrania, megrim, migraine
crass-	thick	Latin	crassus	crass, crassitude, crassulaceous
crea-	make	Latin	creare, creatus	creation, creative, creator, creature, creole, procreation, recreation
cred-	believe, trust	Latin	credere, creditus	accreditation, credence, credentials, credibility, credible, credit, creditor, credo, credulity, credulous, creed, discredit, incredible, incredulous, miscreant, recreant
crepid-	boot, shoe	Greek	κρηπίς, κρηπίδος (krēpís, krēpídos), κρηπίδιον, κρηπίδωμα	crepidoma
cresc-	grow, rise	Latin	crescere	accresce, accrescence, accrescent, accrete, accretion, accrue, concrete, crescendo, crescent, crew, decrease, increase, recruit, recruitment, surcrew
cribr-	sieve	Latin	cribrum, cribrare	cribble, cribellate, cribellum, cribrate, cribriform, garble
cric-	ring	Greek	κρίκος (kríkos), κρικοειδής (krikoeidḗs)	cricoid, cricoidectomy, Cricosaurus, cricothyroid, cricothyrotomy, cricotomy
crisp-	curled	Latin	crispus	crape, crepe, crêpe, crisp, crispate, crispation
crist-	crest	Latin	crista	crease, crest, cristate
crit-, crisi-	judge, separate	Greek	κρίνειν (krínein), κρίσις (krísis), κρίμα (kríma)	apocrine, crisis, criterion, critic, critical, criticaster, criticise, criticism, critique, diacritic, eccrine, eccrinology, eccrisis, eccritic, endocrine, endocrinology, exocrine, heterocrine, holocrine, hypercriticism, hypocrisy, hypocrite, kritarchy, Kritosaurus, merocrine, syncrisis
cross-	fringe, tassel	Greek	κροσσός (krossós)	Crossopterygii
cruc-	cross	Latin	crux, crucis	cross, crucial, cruciate, crucifer, cruciferous, crucifix, crucifixion, cruciform, crucify, crucigerous, cruise, crusade, cruzeiro, discruciate, excruciate, intercross, recross
crur-	leg, shank	Latin	crus, cruris	bicrural, crural, crus, equicrural
cry-	cold	Greek	κρύος (krúos)	cryoablation, cryo-adsorption, cryobacterium, cryobiology, cryobot, cryochemistry, cryoelectronics, cryogenics, cryomicroscopy, cryoneurolysis, cryonics, cryopreservation, cryoprotectant, cryosphere, cryosurgery, cryotherapy, cryovolcano
-cry	wail, shriek	Latin	critare, from quiritare	cry, decry, descry
crypt-	hide, hidden	Greek	κρύπτειν (krúptein) "to hide", κρυπτός (kruptós)	apocrypha, apocryphal, archaeocryptography, crypt, cryptanalysis, crypteia, cryptic, cryptobiosis, cryptobiotic, cryptochrome, cryptogam, cryptogenic, cryptography, cryptology, cryptomonad, cryptophyte, cryptosystem, grot, grotesque, grotto
cten-	comb	Greek	κτείς, κτενός (kteís, ktenós)	ctenidium, ctenoid, Ctenophora
cub-	cube	Greek	κύβος (kúbos)	cubic, cuboctahedron, cuboid, hemicube, hypercube
cub-	lie	Latin	cubare	incubation, succuba
culin-	kitchen	Latin	culīna	culinarian, culinary, kiln
culp-	blame, fault	Latin	culpa	culpability, culpable, culprit, exculpate, exculpatory, inculpable, inculpate, inculpatory, mea culpa
cune-	wedge	Latin	cuneus	coign, coigne, coin, cuneate, cuneiform, cuneus, encoignure, obcuneate, precuneus, quoin, sconcheon, scuncheon
cur-	care for	Latin	cūra, curare	accuracy, accurate, assecure, assurance, assure, curability, curable, curacy, curate, curative, curator, cure, curettage, curette, curio, curiosity, curious, ensure, inaccuracy, inaccurate, incurable, insecure, insecurity, insurability, insurable, insurance, insure, manicure, pedicure, pococurante, proctor, proctour, proctorage, proctorial, procurable, procuracy, procuration, procurator, procure, procurement, proxy, reassurance, reassure, reinsurance, reinsure, scour, scourage, secure, security, sinecural, sinecure, sure, surety
curr-, curs-	run, course	Latin	currere, cursus	concur, concurrent, corridor, courier, course, currency, current, cursive, cursor, cursory, discourse, excursion, incur, occur, recur, recursion, recursive, succor
curv-	bent	Latin	curvus "crooked, curved", from curvare "to bend"	cavort, curb, curvaceous, curvate, curvation, curvature, curve, curviform, curvilinear, curvity, incurvate, incurvature, incurve, recurvate, recurve, recurvous
cuspid-	lance, point	Latin	cuspis, cuspidis	bicuspid, bicuspidate, cusp, quadricuspid, tricuspid
cut-	hide, skin	Latin	cutis	cutaneous, cuticle, cuticolor, cuticular, cutin, cutis, cutisector, intracutaneous, subcutaneous
cyan-	blue	Greek	κυανός (kuanós)	anthocyanin, cyanic, cyanide, cyanogen, cyanophobia, cyanophore, cyanosis, cyanotic, isocyanic
cycl-	circle	Greek	κύκλος (kúklos), κυκλικός (kuklikós)	acyclic, anticyclone, anticyclonic, bicycle, cycle, cyclic, cyclide, cycloid, cyclone, cyclops, cyclosis, cyclotomic, dicyclic, eccyclema, epicycle, epicycloid, hemicycle, hemicyclium, heterocyclic, homocyclic, hypercycle, hypocycloid, isocyclic, mesocyclone, monocyclic, polycyclic, pseudocyclosis, tetracyclic, tricycle, tricyclic, unicycle
cylind-	roll	Greek	κυλίνδειν (kulíndein), κύλινδρος (kúlindros)	cylinder, cylindric, cylindroid, cylindroma, pseudocylindric
cyn-	dog	Greek	κύων, κυνός (kúōn, kunós)	cynic, cynicism, cynodont, cynology, cynophagy, cynophilia, cynophobia, Cynosaurus, cynosure, eucynodont
cyst-	capsule	Greek	κύστις (kústis)	cysteine, cystic, cysticercus, cystine, cystolith, cystoma, oocyst, polycystic
cyt-	cell	Greek	κύτος (kútos)	astrocyte, cnidocyte, cytapheresis, cytaster, cytokine, cytokinesis, cytokinin, cytology, cytoplasm, cytostasis, cytostatic, exocytosis, gonocyte, hypercytosis, leukocyte, leukocytosis, monocyte, monocytopoiesis, pancytopenia, phagocytosis, polycythaemia, polycythemia, syncytium

Lists of Greek and Latin roots in English beginning with other letters:
- A
- B
- C
- D
- E
- F
- G
- H
- I
- J
- K
- L
- M
- N
- O
- P
- Q
- R
- S
- T
- U
- V
- X
- Z

== D ==
Root	Meaning in English	Origin language	Etymology (root origin)	English examples
da-, dida- (ΔΑ)	learn	Greek	δάω	autodidact, Didache, didact, didactic, didacticism
dacry-	tear	Greek	δάκρυον, δακρύειν, δάκρυμα (dákruma)	dacryoadenitis, Dacryphilia
dactyl-	digit, finger, toe	Greek	δάκτυλος (dáktulos)	anisodactyly, antidactylus, arachnodactyly, artiodactyl, brachydactyly, clinodactyly, dactyl, dactylic, dactylology, dactylomancy, dactylomegaly, dactylus, dactyly, date, didactyly, ectrodactyly, heterodactylous, heterodactyly, leptodactylous, monodactyly, oligodactyly, pamprodactyly, pentadactyl, pentadactylous, pentadactyly, perissodactyl, polydactyly, pterodactyl, schizodactyly, syndactylous, syndactyly, tetradactylous, tetradactyly, tridactyly, zygodactyly
dam- (ΔΑΜ)	tame	Greek	δάμασις (dámasis), ἀδάμας (adámas) "untameable, invincible"	adamant, adamantine, adamantinoma, Damian
damn-, -demn-	to inflict loss upon	Latin	damnum, damnāre	condemn, condemnation, damage, damnation, indemnify, indemnity
de-	bind	Greek	δεῖν (deîn), δετός, δέσις (detós, désis), δέμα (déma), δεσμός (desmós), δέσμα (désma)	arthrodesis, asyndeton, desmid, desmitis, desmoid, desmoplasia, desmosome, diadem, plasmodesma, polysyndeton, syndesis, syndesmosis, syndetic, syndeton
de-	down, away from, removing	Latin	dē	decay, decide, declare, decline, decompose, dedicate, deduce, defend, deletion, delineate, delude, demarcate, dementia, depress, derogatory, desecrate, descend, destroy, detract
deb-	owe	Latin	debere, debitus	debit, debt
dec-	ten	Latin from Greek	δέκα (déka) "ten", δεκάς, δεκάδος (dekás, dekádos), δεκάκις (dekákis) "ten times", δεκαπλάσιος (dekaplásios) "ten-fold" decem, "ten" decies, "ten times" decumo, "tenfold"	decad, decade, decagon, decagram, decahedron, Decalogue, decamer, decamerous, decameter, decapod, decathlon
decim-	tenth part	Latin	decimus, tenth; from decem, ten	decimal, decimate, decimation, decimator, decuman, dime
decor-	ornament	Latin	decorus "fit, proper" and decorare "to decorate", from decor "beauty, ornament" and decus "ornament"	decor, décor, decorament, decorate, decoration, decorative, decorator, decorous, decorum, redecorate
del-	erase	Latin	delere (from dē + linere)	delete, deletion, indelible
delt-	D, d	Greek	Δ, δ, δέλτα (délta)	delta, deltoid, deltahedron
dem-, dom-	build	Greek	δέμειν (démein), δῶμα, δῶματος, δομή, δόμος (dómos), δέμας (démas)	apodeme, monodomy, opisthodomos, polydomy
dem-	people	Greek	δῆμος (dêmos)	Damocles, demagogue, deme, democracy, demographic, demography, demonym, demophobia, demotic, ecdemic, endemic, epidemic, epidemiology, pandemic
den-	ten each	Latin	dēnī	denar, denarian, denarius, denary, denier, dinar, dinero, dinheiro
dendr-	tree	Greek	δένδρον (déndron); akin to δρύς (drús) "tree"	dendric, dendrite, dendrochronology, dendrogram, dendromancy, Epidendrum, rhododendron
dens-	thick	Latin	densus	condensable, condensate, condensation, condensational, condensative, condense, dense, density, nondense, superdense
dent-	tooth	Latin	dens, dentis	bident, bidental, dandelion, dental, dentary, dentate, dentation, dentelle, denticity, denticle, denticulate, dentiferous, dentiform, dentifrice, dentigerous, dentil, dentin, dentinal, dentine, dentition, denture, indent, indentation, indenture, interdental, interdentil, intradental, multidentate, quadridentate, trident, tridentate
der-	skin	Greek	δέρειν (dérein), δέρμα, δέρματος (dérma, dérmatos)	Dermaptera, dermatology, dermis, ectoderm, endoderm, epidermis, hypodermic, mesoderm, scleroderma, taxidermy, xeroderma
despot-	master	Greek	δεσπότης, δεσπότου, δεσποτικός, δεσποτεία, δεσποτίσκος	despot, despotic, despotism
deuter-	second	Greek	δεύτερος (deúteros)	deuteragonist, deuteranomaly, deuteranopia, deuteride, deuterium, deuterogamist, deuterogamy, Deuteromycota, deuteron, Deuteronomy, deuterostome
dexi-	right	Greek	δεξιός (dexiós)	Dexiarchia
dexter-	right	Latin	dexter	ambidexterity, ambidextrous, dexter, dexterity, dexterous, dextral, dextrality, dextrin, dextrorse, dextrose
di-	two	Greek	δι- (di-)	diatomic, dicot, digamy, diode, dipole
dia-	apart, through	Greek	διά (diá)	deacon, diagram, dialysis, diameter
div-, diff-	different	Latin	diversum	different, divergence, diversity, divide, diffeomorphism
diacosi-	two hundred	Greek	διακόσιοι (diakósioi), διακοσιάκις "two hundred times"	diacosigon, diacosipentecontaheptagon
dic-, dict-	say, speak, proclaim	Latin	dīcere, dictus, dictare	benediction, contradict, dictate, dictation, dictator, diction, dictionary, dictum, edict, indictment, interdiction, malediction, predict, prediction, valediction, verdict
dida-	teach	Greek	διδάσκειν (didáskein)	autodidact, Didache, didact, didactic
digit-	finger	Latin	digitus	bidigitate, digit, digital, digitate, digitiform, digitigrade, multidigit, multidigitate
din-	terrible, fearfully great	Greek	δεινός (deinós)	dinosaur
dipl-	twofold	Greek	διπλόος (diplóos), δίπλωσις (díplōsis), δίπλωμα (díplōma)	diploblasty, diploid, diploidy, diploma, diplomacy, diplomat, diplomatic, diplomatics, diplonema, diplophase, diplopia, diplosis, diplotene, haplodiploid, haplodiploidy
do- (ΔΟ)	give	Greek	διδόναι (didónai), δοτός, (dotós,), δόσις (dósis), δόμα, δόματος (dóma, dómatos) δῶρον, διδόμενον	anecdote, antidoron, antidote, apodosis, dose
doc-, doct-	teach	Latin	docere, doctus	docile, doctor, doctrine, document, indoctrinate, indoctrination
dodec-	twelve	Greek	δώδεκα (dṓdeka)	dodecagon, dodecahedron, Dodecanese, dodecaphony, dodecastyle, dodecasyllabic, hemidodecahedron
dog-, dox-	opinion, tenet	Greek	δοκεῖν (dokeîn) "to appear, seem, think", δόξα (dóxa) "opinion", δόγμα (dógma)	dogma, dogmatic, dogmatism, doxology, heterodox, orthodox, paradox
dol-	pain	Latin	dolere "to grieve", also dolus "grief" and dolor "pain"	condolence, dol, doleful, dolorous, indolence
dom-	house	Latin	domus	dame, domal, dome, domestic, domesticate, domestication, domesticity, domestique, domicile, domiciliary, major-domo, semidome
domin-	master	Latin	dominus "master"; (from domus "house")	beldam, beldame, belladonna, codomain, codominance, codominant, condominium, dam, dame, damsel, danger, demesne, demoiselle, domain, dominance, dominant, dominate, domination, dominative, dominator, dominatrix, domine, domineer, dominicide, dominion, dominium, domino, duenna, dungeon, madam, madame, mademoiselle, madonna, predominance, predominant, predominate, quasidominance, semidominance, subdominant, superdominant
domit-	tame	Latin	domitare, frequentative of domare	daunt, domitable, indomitable
don-	give	Latin	dōnum, donare	condonation, condone, donate, donation, donative, donator, donatory, donor, pardon, pardonable
dorm-	sleep	Latin	dormire	dormant, dormitory
dors-	back	Latin	dorsum	disendorse, dorsal, dorsiferous, dorsiflexion, dorsiflexor, dorsigrade, dorsiventral, dorsum, dossier, endorse, endorsee, endorsement, indorse, indorsement, reredos
dra-	do	Greek	δρᾶν (drân), δραστικός (drastikós), δρᾶσις (drâsis), δρᾶμα, δράματος (drâma, drámatos), δραματικός (dramatikós)	dramatic, dramaturgy, drastic, melodramatic, monodrama
drac-	dragon	Latin	draco	Draco, draconian
drach-	grasp	Greek	δράσσεσθαι (drássesthai), δράγμα (drágma), δραχμή (drakhmḗ)	didrachm, drachm, drachma, dram, tetradrachm
dram-, drom- (ΔΡΑΜ)	run	Greek	δραμεῖν (drameîn), δρόμος (drómos)	aerodrome, anadromous, antidromic, catadromous, diadromous, dromaeosaurid, heterodromous, hippodrome, loxodrome, monodromy, palindrome, syndrome
dros-	dew	Greek	δρόσος, δρόσου (drósos, drósou)	drosometer, Drosophila
dry-	tree	Greek	δρῦς, δρυός (drûs, druós), Δρυάς	dryad, dryadic, hamadryad
du-	two	Latin	duo	deuce, doubt, dual, duality, duet, duo, duplex, duplicity, duumvirate, duumviri, nonduality
dub-	doubtful	Latin	dubius	doubt, dubiety, dubious
duc-, duct-	lead	Latin	ducere, ductus	abduce, abduct, adduce, adduct, conduce, deduce, induce, introduce, produce, reduce, seduce, traduce
dulc-	sweet	Latin	dulcis	billet-doux, dolce, dolcetto, douce, doux, dulcet, dulcian, dulcify, dulcimer, edulcorant, edulcorate, subdulcid
dur-	hard	Latin	durus, durare	dour, dura, durability, durable, durain, dural, duramen, durance, durancy, duration, durative, dure, duress, durity, durous, durum, endurable, endurance, endurant, endure, indurate, induration, nondurable, obduracy, obdurate, obduration, perdurable, perdurance, perdure, subdural
dy-	two	Greek	δύο (dúo), δυάς, δυάδος (duás, duádos)	dyad, dyadic
dyna-	power	Greek	δύνασθαι (dúnasthai), δυνατός, δύναμις (dúnamis), δυνάστης (dunástēs)	aerodynamic, aerodynamics, antidynastic, autodyne, didynamous, dynamic, dynamism, dynamite, dynamo, dynast, dynastic, dynasty, heterodyne, metadynamics
dys-	badly, ill	Greek	δυσ- (dus-)	dysentery, dysphagia, dysphasia, dysplasia, dystopia, dystrophy

Lists of Greek and Latin roots in English beginning with other letters:
- A
- B
- C
- D
- E
- F
- G
- H
- I
- J
- K
- L
- M
- N
- O
- P
- Q
- R
- S
- T
- U
- V
- X
- Z

== E ==
Root	Meaning in English	Origin language	Etymology (root origin)	English examples
ebon-	dark	Greek	ἔβενος (ébenos)	ebony, ebonize, ébéniste (from French)
ec-	out	Greek	ἐκ (ek)	eccentric, ecstasy, ecstatic
ecclesi-	assembly, congregation	Greek	ἐκκλησία (ekklēsía) from ἐκκαλέω (ekkaléō) "I summon" or "I call out"	Ecclesiastes, ecclesiastical
ech-	sound	Greek	ἠχή, ἠχώ, ἠχοῦς, ἠχεῖν (ēkheîn), ἤχημα	anechoic, catechesis, catechism, catechist, catechize, catechumen, echo, echoic
eco-	house	Greek	οἶκος (oîkos)	ecology, economics, economy, ecumenism
ecto-	outside	Greek	ἐκτός (ektós)	ectoderm, ectoparasite, ectotherm
ed-, es-	eat	Latin	edere, esus	comedo, comestible, edacity, edibility, edible, escarole, esculent, esurience, esurient, inedia, inedible, inescation, inescate, obese, obesity
eg-	goat	Greek	αἴξ, αἰγός (aíx, aigós)	egophony
egypt-	Egypt, egyptian	Greek	αἰγυπτος (aigyptos)	egyptology
ego-	self, I (first person)	Latin, Greek	ego, ἐγώ (egṓ)	egocentric, egocentrism, egoism, egoistic, egomania, egomaniac
eiren- (iren-)	peace	Greek	εἰρήνη (eirḗnē) "peace"	irenic (eirenic), irenology
electr-	amber	Greek	ἤλεκτρον (ḗlektron)	electric, electricity, electrolysis, electrolyte, electromagnetic, electron, electronic, polyelectrolyte
elem-, alm-	pity	Greek	ἔλεος, ἐλέου (éleos, eléou), ἐλεημοσύνη (eleēmosúnē)	almoner, alms, eleemosynary
em-, empt-	buy	Latin	emere, emptus	adeem, adempt, ademption, exemption, preempt, redeem
eme-	vomit	Greek	ἐμεῖν (emeîn), ἔμετος (émetos)	antiemetic, emesis, emetic, emetine, emetophobia, haematemesis
emul-	striving to equal, rivaling	Latin	aemulus, aemulare	emulator
en-, el-, em-	in	Greek	ἐν (en)	emphasis, enclitic, enthusiasm, ellipsis, elliptic
enanti-	opposite	Greek	ἐναντίος (enantíos)	enantiomer, enantiomerism, enantiomorph, enantiornithine
encephal-	brain	Greek	ἐγκέφαλος (enképhalos)	encephalopathy
endo-	inside, within	Greek	ἔνδον (éndon)	endocardial, endocerid, endocrine, endocytosis, endogamy, endogenous, endorheic, endoscopy, endoskeleton, endosperm, endospore
engy-	narrow	Greek	ἐγγύς (engús)	Engystomops, hypengyophobia
ennea-	nine	Greek	ἐννέα (ennéa), ἐννεάς, ἐννεάδος (enneás, enneádos)	ennead, enneadic, enneagon, enneagram, enneahedron, enneamer, enneastyle, enneasyllabic, enneode
ens-	sword	Latin	ensis	ensiferous, ensiform
eo-, eos-	dawn, east	Greek	Ἠώς, Ἕως (Ēṓs, Héōs)	Eocene, eohippus, Eosentomon, eosin, eosinophil, eosinophilic, Eozoic
ep-, epi-	upon	Greek	ἐπί (epí)	ephedra, ephemeral, ephemeris, epicenter, epidemic, epilog, epiphany, episteme, epistemic, epistemology, epitaph, epitaphios, epithet, epitome, epoch, eponymous
equ-, -iqu-	even, equal, level	Latin	aequus	equal, equanimity, equate, Equator, equilibrium, equinox, equipoise, equity, equivalence, equivocal, equivocate, iniquity
equ-	horse	Latin	equus	equestrian
ere-	row	Greek	ἐρέσσειν (eréssein), ἐρέτης (erétēs) "rower", ἐρετμόν (eretmón), εἰρεσία	trireme, trierarch, hyperetes
erg-, org-, urg-	work	Greek	ϝέργον (wérgon), έργον (érgon), ἐργάτης (ergátēs), ὄργανον (órganon), ὀργανικός (organikós), ὄργια (órgia)	allergic, allergy, argon, demiurge, dramaturgy, endoergic, energetic, energy, erg, ergate, ergatocracy, ergodic, ergometer, ergonomics, ergophobia, exoergic, gamergate, georgic, heterorganic, homorganic, liturgy, metallurgy, microorganism, organ, organic, organism, organist, organize, organogenesis, organoid, organoleptic, orgiastic, orgy, parergon, surgeon, synergism, synergy, theurgic, theurgist, theurgy, zymurgy
erot-	(sexual) love	Greek	ἔρως, ἔρωτος (érōs, érōtos)	erogenous, erotic, erotomania, erotophilia, erotophobia
err-	stray	Latin	errare	aberrance, aberrancy, aberrant, aberration, err, errant, erratic, erratum, erroneous, error, inerrant
erythr-	red	Greek	ἐρυθρός (eruthrós), ἐρύθημα (erúthēma)	erythema, Erythraean, erythraemia, [Erythrism[]] erythroblastopenia, erythrocyte, erythrocytosis, erythromelalgia, erythrophobia, erythrophore, erythroprosopalgia
eso-	within	Greek	ἔσω (ésō)	esophoria, esoteric, esotericism, esotropia
eteo-	true, original	Greek	ἐτεός (eteós)	Eteocretan, Eteocypriot
eth-	custom, habit	Greek	ἐθεῖν (etheîn), ἦθος (êthos)	ethic, ethics, ethology, ethos
ethm-	sieve, sift	Greek	ἠθεῖν (ētheîn), ἠθμός (ēthmós); ἤθειν (ḗthein)	ethmoid
ethn-	people, race, tribe, nation	Greek	ἔθνος (éthnos), ἐθνικός (ethnikós)	ethnarch, ethnarchy, ethnic, ethnoarchaeology, ethnography, ethnomusicology, polyethnic
etym-	true	Greek	ἔτυμος (étumos)	etymologic, etymologicon, etymologist, etymologize, etymology, etymon
eu-	well, good	Greek	εὖ (eû)	aneuploidy, eudaemon (eudemon), eukaryote, euphony, euphoria, euphoric, euploid, euthanasia
eur-	wide	Greek	εὐρύς (eurús), εὖρος "breadth, width"	aneurysm, eureka, Europe, eurypterid, microaneurysm
ex-, e-, ef-	outside, out of, from, out	Latin	ex	exclude, exist, exit, extend, extrude
exo-	outside	Greek	ἔξω (éxō)	exogamy, exoplanet, exoskeleton, exosome, exosphere, exoteric, exothermic, exotic, exoticism, exotropia
extra-	outer	Latin	extra, extraneus and exterus	estrange, estrangement, exterior, extra, extraneous, extraordinary, strange
extrem-	outermost, utmost	Latin	extremus	extreme, extremity, extremophile

Lists of Greek and Latin roots in English beginning with other letters:
- A
- B
- C
- D
- E
- F
- G
- H
- I
- J
- K
- L
- M
- N
- O
- P
- Q
- R
- S
- T
- U
- V
- X
- Z

== F ==
Root	Meaning in English	Origin language	Etymology (root origin)	English examples
fa-, fa (FA)	say, speak	Latin	fārī, see also fatērī	affable, bifarious, confess, defamation, fable, fame, fascinate, fate, ineffability, infamy, infancy, infant, infantry, nefarious, preface, profess
fab-	bean	Latin	faba	faba bean
fac-, fact-, -fect-, -fic- (FAC)	do, make	Latin	facere, factus	affair, affect, affectation, amplify, artifact, artifice, benefactor, benefice, benefit, confection, counterfeit, defeat, defect, disaffect, edifice, effect, effectible, effection, effective, effectivity, effector, effectual, effectuality, effectuate, effectuation, efficacious, efficacity, efficacy, efficiency, efficient, enface, enfacement, facade/façade, face, facet, facette, facial, faciend, facient, facile, facilitate, facilitation, facilitative, facilitator, facilitatory, facility, facinorous, facsimile, fact, faction, factional, factionary, factious, factitious, factor, factorable, factorial, factory, factotum, factual, fake, fashion, feasible, feat, feature, feckless, fiat, forfeit, infect, inofficious, interoffice, laissez-faire, malefaction, manufacture, modify, nonofficial, office, official, officiant, officiary, officiate, officious, olfaction, omnificence, omnificent, parfait, perfect, perfecta, perfectibility, perfectible, perfection, perfective, perfector, pluperfect, prefect, prefectural, prefecture, prequalification, proficiency, proficient, profit, profitability, profitable, profiteer, profiterole, prolific, qualification, quasiperfect, rarefy, refactorable, refashion, refect, refection, refectory, reinfect, remanufacture, resurface, reunification, sacrifice, scientific, semelfactive, suboffice, subprefect, suffice, sufficiency, sufficient, superficial, superficiality, surface, surfeit, surficial, transfection, trifacial, trifecta, uniface, unifacial, unifactorial, unification
falc-	sickle	Latin	falx, falcis	defalcation, falcate, falciform, falchion, falcon
fall-, fallac-, fals-	false, deceive	Latin	fallere, falsus, fallāx, fallācis	default, fail, fallacious, fallacy, fallible, false, falsetto, falsify, falsity, fault
famili-	a close attendant	Latin	famulus	familiarity, family
fasc-	bundle	Latin	fascis	fajita, fasciculation, fascism
fatu-	foolish, useless	Latin	fatuus	fatuous, infatuation
feder-	treaty, agreement, contract, league, pact	Latin	foederāre, from foedus (genitive foederis); see also fides "faith"	confederacy, confederation, federal, federate, federation
fel-	cat	Latin	fēlēs, fēlis	Felinae, feline
felic-	happy, merry	Latin	fēlīx, fēlīcis	felicity
fell-	suck	Latin	fellāre	fellation
femin-	women, female	Latin	fēmina	femininity
femor-	thigh	Latin	femur (genitive femoris)	femoral, femur
fend-, fens-	strike	Latin	fendere, -fensus	defend, fend, offend, offense
fenestr-	window	Latin	fenestra	defenestration
fer-	wild, fierce	Latin	ferus	feral, fierce
-fer-	to bear, carry	Latin	ferre	aquifer, circumference, confer, conifer, defer, differ, ferry, fertile, infer, Lucifer, offer, prefer, refer, suffer, transfer, vociferous
ferv-	boil, glow	Latin	fervēre	ferment, fervent, fervid, fervor, perfervid
feroc-	fierce	Latin	ferōx, ferōcis	ferocity
ferr-	iron	Latin	ferrum	ferrous
fet-	stink	Latin	fētēre	fetid, fetor
fic-	fig	Latin	fīcus	Ficus, fig
fid-, fis-	faith, trust	Latin	fidēs "faith, trust", from fidere "to trust"	confidante, confidence, confident, diffident, faith, fealty, fidelity, fiduciary, infidel, perfidious, perfidy
fig-, fing-, fict- (FIG)	to form, shape	Latin	fingere "to touch, handle; devise; fabricate, alter, change"	configure, disfigure, effigy, feign, fiction, fictitious, figment, figurine, nonfiction, transfigure
fil-	thread	Latin	fīlum	defile, filament, file, filigree, fillet, profile
fili-	son	Latin	filius	affiliation
fin-	end	Latin	fīnis	affinity, confine, define, final, finale, finance, fine, finish, finite, infinite, refine
find-, fiss- (FID)	cleave, split	Latin	findere, fissus	fission, fissure
firm-	firm, strong	Latin	firmus, firmāre	affirm, confirm, confirmation, firm, firmament, infirm
fistul-	hollow, tube	Latin	fistula	fistula
fix-	attach	Latin	fīxāre, frequentative of fīgere	affix, fix, fixation, fixture, prefix, suffix, transfix
fl-, fla- (FLA)	blow	Latin	flāre, flātus	afflatus, conflate, deflate, flatulence, flatus, flavor, flute, inflate, insufflation, soufflé, sufflate
flacc-	flabby	Latin	flaccus, flaccere	flaccid
flav-	yellow	Latin	flāvus	flavonoid
flect-, flex-	bend	Latin	flectere, flexus	circumflex, deflect, flex, flexible, flexile, flexion, flexor, genuflection, inflect, inflection, reflect, reflection, reflex
flig-, flict-	strike	Latin	flīgere, -flīctus	afflict, conflict, inflict, profligacy, profligate
flor-	flower	Latin	flōs, flōris	floral, florid
flu-, fluv-, flux-	flow	Latin	fluere, fluxus	affluent, confluence, effluent, fluctuate, fluctuation, fluency, fluent, fluid, fluidity, flush, fluvial, flux, influence, influx, superfluous
foc-	hearth	Latin	focus	bifocal, focal, focus
fod-, foss-	dig	Latin	fodere, fossus	fossil
foen-	hay	Latin	foenum	Foeniculum
foli-	leaf	Latin	folium	defoliant
font-	spring	Latin	fōns, fontis	font, fontal, fontanelle
for-	bore, drill	Latin	forāre, forātus	foralite, foramen, foraminifer, perforation
form-	shape	Latin	fōrma	conform, deform, form, formal, formation, formula, formulate, inform, perform, reform, uniform
formic-	ant	Latin	formīca	formaldehyde, formic acid
fornic-	vault	Latin	fornix, fornicis	fornication
fort-	strong	Latin	fortis	force, fort, forte, fortify, fortitude, fortress
fove-	shallow round depression	Latin	fovea	fovea
frag-, frang-, -fring-, fract-	break	Latin	frangere, frāctus	defray, diffract, fractal, fraction, fractious, fracture, fragile, fragment, frangible, fray, infraction, infringe, refract, refractory, refrain
frater-, fratr-	brother	Latin	frāter	fraternal, fraternity
fric-, frict-	rub	Latin	fricāre, frictus	dentifrice, friction
frig-	cold	Latin	frīgere	frigid, frigorific
front-	forehead	Latin	frōns, frontis	confront, frontage, frontal
fruct-, frug-	fruit	Latin	frūx, frūgis; frū̆ctus	fructose, frugivorous
fug-, fugit-	flee	Latin	fugere	centrifuge, fugacious, fugitive, refuge
fum-	smoke	Latin	fūmus	fume, fumigation
fund-	bottom	Latin	fundāre "to found", from fundus "bottom, foundation"	found, founder, foundation, fund, fundament, fundamental, fundamentalism, profound, profundity
fund-, fus-	pour	Latin	fundere, fūsus	confound, diffusion, effusion, effusive, found, fusion, infusion, perfusion, profuse, profusion, refund, suffusion, transfusion
fulmin-, fulgur-	flash	Latin	fulmen "lightning flash"	fulminant, fulminate, fulmination, fulgurite
fung-, funct-	do	Latin	fungī, fūnctus	function, fungibility
fur-, furt-	thief, steal	Latin	fūr (genitive fūris) "thief", fūrāre	ferret, furtive
furc-	fork	Latin	furca	bifurcation
fusc-	dark	Latin	fuscus	fuscous, infuscate, infuscation, obfuscate, obfuscation

Lists of Greek and Latin roots in English beginning with other letters:
- A
- B
- C
- D
- E
- F
- G
- H
- I
- J
- K
- L
- M
- N
- O
- P
- Q
- R
- S
- T
- U
- V
- X
- Z

== G ==
Root	Meaning in English	Origin language	Etymology (root origin)	English examples
galact- (ΓΛΑΚ)	milk	Greek	γάλα, γάλακτος (gála, gálaktos)	galactagogue, galactic, galactorrhea, lactose, polygala, polygalactia, galaxy
gam-	marriage, wedding	Greek	γάμος (gámos), γαμεῖν (gameîn), γαμέτης (gamétēs), γαμετή (gametḗ)	agamic, agamogenesis, agamospermy, agamy, allogamy, anisogamete, anisogamy, apogamy, autogamy, cleistogamous, cleistogamy, cryptogam, deuterogamist, deuterogamy, digamous, digamy, endogamous, endogamy, exogamous, exogamy, gamete, gametic, gametocyte, gametogenesis, gametophyte, geitonogamy, heterogametic, heterogamous, heterogamy, homogametic, karyogamy, misogamy, monogamous, monogamy, oogamy, planogamete, plasmogamy, polygamist, polygamy
gamb-	leg	Latin	gamba	gam, gambit, gambol, gammon
gamm-	G, g	Greek	Γ, γ, γάμμα (gámma)	gamma
gar- (GAR)	chatter	Latin	garrire	gargantuan, gargle, gargoyle, garrulous, jargon
gargal-	tickle	Greek	γαργαλίζειν (gargalízein), γαργαλιζόμενον (gargalizómenon), γαργαλισμός (gargalismós)	gargalesis, gargalesthesia, hypergargalesthesia
gargar-	gargle	Greek	γαργαρίζειν (gargarízein), γαργαρισμός (gargarismós), γαργαρεών	gargarize
gastr-	stomach	Greek	γαστήρ, γαστρός (gastḗr, gastrós)	epigastric, epigastrium, gasteroid, gastric, gastrin, gastritis, gastroenterologist, gastroenterology, gastrolith, gastronomic, gastronomy, gastroparesis, gastropod, gastroptosis, gastroschisis, gastrotrich, mesogastric, Myxogastria
ge-, geo-	earth	Greek	γῆ (gê), γαῖα, γαίας (gaîa, gaías), γεω- (geō-)	apogee, biogeography, epigeous, Gaia, geocentric, geocentrism, geode, geodesy, geodetic, geography, geoid, geology, geomancy, geometry, geomorphology, geophysicist, geophysics, georgic, Georgics, geosphere, geostatic, geostrophic, geosynchronous, geosyncline, hypogeous, hypogeum, Pangea, perigee
geiton-	neighbor	Greek	γείτων, γείτονος (geítōn, geítonos), γειτόνημα	geitonogamy
gel-	icy cold	Latin	gelum	congeal, congelation, gel, gelati, gelatin, gelatinous, gelation, gelato, gelée, gelid, gelifluction, gelignite, jellification, jelly
gen-, gon- (ΓΕΝ)	birth, beget, race, kind	Greek	γίγνεσθαι (gígnesthai), and related γένος (génos), γενετικός (genetikós), γένεσις (génesis); see also γενεά (geneá)	allergen, anagenesis, antigen, autogenesis, autogenous, biogenesis, dysgenic, endogen, endogenous, epigene, epigenesis, epigenetics, epigone, erogenous, Eugene, eugenic, eugenics, exogenous, gametogenesis, gene, genealogy, genesis, genetic, genocide, genotype, genophobia, gonad, heterogeneous, homogenesis, homogenetic, homogeneous, hydrogen, hypogene, hypogenesis, hypogenic, hypogenous, monogenic, oogenesis, paragenesis, pathogen, polygenous, progenesis, pseudogene, spermatogenesis
gen- (GEN)	beget	Latin	gignere, genitus, genus (genitive generis), see also generare	congenial, engender, gender, generate, generation, genial, genius, genital, genitive, genteel, gentle, genuine, genus, indigenous, ingenious, ingenuous, primogenitor, progeny
gephyr-	bridge	Greek	γέφυρα (géphura), γεφυρόω	gephyrophobia
ger-	old	Greek	γέρων, γέροντος (gérōn, gérontos) "old man", γηράσκω "grow old"	erigeron, gerascophobia, geriatric, geriatrics, gerontocracy, gerontology, gerontophile, gerontophilia, gerontophobia, gerontoplast, gerousia, progeria, progeroid
ger-, gest- (GES)	bear, carry	Latin	gerere, gestus	agger, congest, digest, gerundive, gestation, register, suggest, vicegerent
geran-	crane	Greek	γέρανος (géranos), γεράνιον (geránion), γερανώδης	Geranium
germ-	sprout	Latin	germen, germinis	germ, German, germane, germicide, germinal, germinate, germination, nongermane, regerminate
geu- (ΓΕΥΣ)	taste	Greek	γεύειν (geúein), γεύεσθαι (geúesthai), γεῦσις, γευόμενον	ageusia, dysgeusia, hypergeusia, hypogeusia, parageusia
glabr-	hairless	Latin	glaber	glabella, glabellar, glabrate, glabrescent, glabrous
glaci-	ice	Latin	glacies	glacé, glacial, glaciation, glacier, glacious, glacis, glance
gladi-	sword	Latin	gladius	gladiator, gladiolus
glauc-	gray	Greek	γλαυκός (glaukós), γλαυκότης, γλαύξ, γλαῦκος	glaucophane, Glaucopsyche, glaucophobia
glia-	glue	Greek	γλία (glía)	glial, glioblastoma, glioma, gliosis, microglia, neuroglia
glob-	sphere	Latin	globus	global, globate, globe, globose, globosity, globular, globule, globulin, inglobate
glori-	glory	Latin	gloria	gloriation, glorification, glorify, gloriole, glorious, glory, inglorious, vainglorious, vainglory
gloss-, glot-	tongue	Greek	γλῶσσα (glôssa), γλωττίς (glōttís)	aglossia, anthropoglot, aryepiglottic, diglossia, epiglottis, gloss, glossary, glossophobia, glottis, heterogloss, heteroglossia, idioglossia, isogloss, monoglot, monoglottism, polyglot, polyglottism
glut-	rump	Greek	γλουτός (gloutós)	gluteus
glutin-	glue	Latin	gluten, glutinis	agglutinant, agglutinate, agglutination, agglutinative, glue, glutelin, gluten, glutinosity, glutinous, nonagglutinative
glyc-	sweet	Greek	γλυκύς (glukús)	glycogen, glycogenesis, glycogenolysis, glycolipid, glycophyte, glycoprotein, glycoside, glycosidic, hypoglycaemia
glyph-	carve	Greek	γλύφειν (glúphein), γλυφή (gluphḗ), γλυπτός (gluptós), γλυπτικός (gluptikós)	aglyphous, anaglyph, ditriglyph, ditriglyphic, glyph, glyptic, Glyptodon, glyptograph, hieroglyph, hieroglyphic, monotriglyph, opisthoglyphous, petroglyph, proteroglyphous, solenoglyphous
gnath-	jaw	Greek	γνάθος (gnáthos), γναθμός	Agnatha, agnathous, chilognath, compsognathus, endognathion, epignathous, exognathion, gnathic, gnathophyma, hypognathous, hystricognath, mesognathion, mesognathous, prognathism
gno- (ΓΝΩ)	know	Greek	γιγνώσκειν (gignṓskein), γνῶναι, γνωτός (gnônai, gnōtós), γνωστός (gnōstós), γνωστικός (gnōstikós), γνῶσις (gnôsis), γνῶσμα, γνώμη (gnôsma, gnṓmē), γνώμων (gnṓmōn)	agnosia, agnostic, agnosticism, anagnorisis, diagnosis, dysanagnosia, gnomic, gnomon, gnomonic, gnosia, gnosis, Gnostic, gnosticism, pathognomonic, physiognomy, prognosis, telegnosis
gnosc-, -gnit-	know	Latin	gnoscere	acquaint, acquaintance, agnition, agnize, cognition, cognitional, cognitive, cognitivity, cognizable, cognizance, cognizant, cognize, cognoscence, cognoscenti, cognoscible, cognovit, connoisseur, ennoble, ennoblement, ignoble, ignorant, ignoscible, incognito, nobiliary, nobilitate, nobilitation, nobility, noble, note, notice, noticeable, notion, notional, notionality, notoriety, notorious, precognition, quaint, reacquaint, recognition, recognize, reconnaissance, reconnoiter, reconnoitre
gon-	corner, angle, knee	Greek	γωνία (gōnía), γόνυ (gónu)	goniometer, gonion, gonioscope, gonitis, gonyaulax, gonycampsis, hexagon, pentagon, polygon, trigon, trigonometry
grad-, gred-, gress- (GRAD)	walk, step, go	Latin	gradi, gressus "to step", from gradus "step"	aggradation, aggression, antegrade, anterograde, centigrade, degrade, degree, egress, gradation, grade, gradient, gradine, gradual, graduality, graduate, graduation, gree, ingress, multigrade, nongraduate, postgraduate, progradation, prograde, progress, regress, retrogradation, retrograde, saltigrade, tardigrade, transgress
gramm-	letter, writing	Greek	γράφειν (gráphein), γράμμα, γράμματος (grámma, grámmatos), γραμματικός (grammatikós)	anagram, anagrammatic, diagram, diagrammatic, engram, epigram, epigrammatic, grammar, grammatic, grammaticist, hologram, lipogram, monogram, pangrammatic, pentagram, program, programmatic, telegram, telegramme, tetragram, tetragrammaton, trigram
gran-	grain	Latin	grānum	degranulation, engrain, filigree, garner, garnet, grain, granary, grange, granger, granite, granivore, granivorous, granivory, granola, granular, granularity, granulate, granulation, granule, grenade, grogram, grosgrain, ingrain, multigrain, pomegranate
grand-	grand	Latin	grandis	aggrandisement, grandee, grandeur, grandific, grandiloquent, grandiloquous, grandiose, grandiosity, grandioso, grandity
graph-	draw, write	Greek	γράφειν (gráphein), γραφικός (graphikós), γραφή (graphḗ), γραφία (graphía), γραφεῖον (grapheîon)	allograft, anepigraphic, autograft, autograph, digraph, epigraphic, epigraphy, graft, graph, grapheme, graphemics, graphene, graphic, graphite, graphology, graphomania, graphospasm, heterograph, hexagraph, holography, homograph, isograft, logographic, micrograph, monograph, orthography, paragraph, photograph, photographic, photomicrograph, polygraph, pseudepigraphy, syngraft, telegraph, telegraphy, tetragraph, trigraph
grat-	thank, please	Latin	grātus, see also gratia	aggrace, agree, agreeable, agreeance, agreement, congratulant, congratulate, congratulatory, congree, disagree, disagreeable, disagreement, disgrace, grace, graciosity, gracioso, gracious, gratification, gratify, gratis, gratitude, gratuitous, gratuity, gratulant, gratulate, gratulation, gratulatory, grazioso, gree, ingrate, ingratiate, ingratiation, ingratitude, maugre, noncongratulatory, nongratuitous
grav-	heavy	Latin	gravis	aggravate, aggravation, aggravative, aggravator, aggrieve, aggrievement, degravation, gravamen, grave, gravid, gravida, gravidity, gravitas, gravitate, gravitation, gravitational, gravity, grief, grieve, grievance, grievant, grievous, ingravescence, ingravescent, multigravida, multigravidity, nongravitational, nulligravida, primigravida, reaggravate, supergravity
greg-	flock, herd	Latin	grex, gregis	aggregate, aggregation, aggregator, congregant, congregate, congregation, congregational, desegregate, desegregation, disaggregate, disgregate, disgregation, egregious, gregarian, gregarine, gregarious, intercongregational, segregate, segregation
gryp-	hooked	Greek	γρυπός (grupós), γρυπότης, γρύπωσις (grupótēs, grúpōsis)	arthrogryposis, Grypoceras, Gryposaurus
gubern-, gov-	govern, pilot	Latin	gubernare	governor, government, govern, gubernatorial,
gust-	taste	Latin	gustus	disgust, gustatory, gusto, gustoso
gutt-	drop	Latin	gutta	gout, gutta, guttate, guttifer, guttiform
guttur-	throat	Latin	guttur	goitre, guttural
gymn-	nude	Greek	γυμνός (gumnós)	gymnasium, gymnast, gymnastics, gymnophobia, gymnoplast, gymnosophist, gymnosperm, gymnospore
gyn-, gynaec-	woman	Greek	γυνή, γυναικός, (gunḗ, gunaikós)	acrogynous, androgyne, androgynous, androgyny, epigyne, epigynous, epigynum, gymnogynous, gynaeceum, gynaecocracy, gynarchy, gyne, gynecocracy, gynecology, gynecomastia, gynodioecious, gynoecium, gynoid, gynophobia, heterogynous, hypogynous, misogynist, monogyny, oligogyny, philogyny, polygynist, polygyny
gyr-	ring	Greek	γῦρος (gûros), γυρός (gurós)	agyria, autogyro, gyre, gyrectomy, gyrencephalic, gyrodyne, gyroid, gyromagnetic, gyromancy, gyroscope, gyrosphere, gyrostat, gyrostatic gyrotropic, gyrus, microgyrus, micropolygyria, pachygyria, polygyria, polymicrogyria, ulegyria
gyrin-	tadpole	Greek	γυρός, γυρῖνος (gurós, gurînos), γυρινώδης (gurinṓdēs)	Gyrinophilus
