= Fananas cell =

Glial cells of the cerebellar cortex

Fañanas cells (also known as Feathered cells of Fañanas) are glial cells of the cerebellar cortex.

They are located in the molecular layer with their cytoplasmatic protrusions extending into the lower part of the molecular layer as well. They are meant to be closely related to and sometimes even called Golgi epithelial cells and are juxtaposed to the Radial glial cells or Bergmann glial cells. Fañanas cells are sometimes defined as "specialised astrocytes".

The feathered cells are named after Jorge Ramón y Cajal Fañanás, a son of Santiago Ramón y Cajal, who first described this type of glial cell in 1916.

== Histology ==
Microscopic studies show that the Fañanas cell represents a satellite glial cell whose protrusions do not contain glial filaments like GFAP. They are located near the somata of Purkinje cells in the granular layer. With regard to the typical "feathered" microscopic structure of the cells, Fañanas glial cells occur in subforms with one, two or multiple "feathers" of cytoplasmatic extensions, that are studded with small, rounded sprouts. The protrusions are often much shorter than those of other Golgi epithelial cells and run parallel to the fibres of the Bergmann glial cells. Fañanas cell extensions are normally not part of the glial limiting membrane.

With the Nissl-method, Fañanas cells can be identified by their slightly bigger, roundish and ovally shaped nuclei, scattered in the molecular and granular layer.

The cells need to be prepared with a gold sublimate impregnation by Ramón y Cajal or a silver staining method.

== Function and clinical relevance ==
The role of the Fañanas cell in the connectivity and structure of the cerebellar cortex is still unknown.

One study found deviations of the expression of Vimentin in patients with Creutzfeldt-Jakob disease (CJD) that could be related to pathological changes in Fañanas glia. These variances were also described in cerebellar microglia and Bergmann cells. However, the results of the study did not point at significant mutations in Fañanas cells but rather described the possible importance of astrocytes in general in the aetiology of CJD.
