= Right Hand of Fellowship =

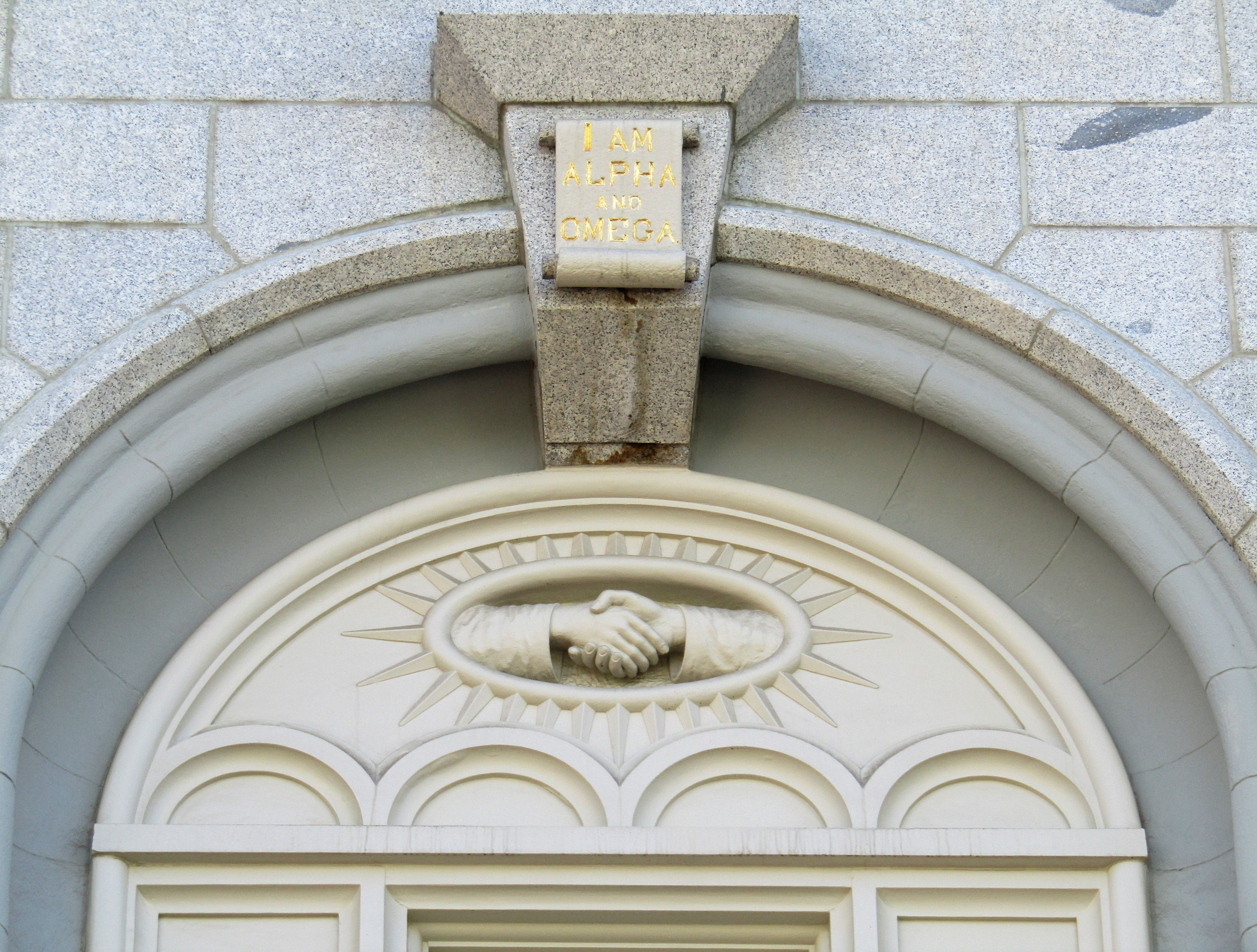
Right Hand of Fellowship as it appears on the Salt Lake Temple.

The Right Hand of Fellowship is a ritual intended to welcome a new member into the fellowship of a congregation or welcoming a new minister into the fellowship of ministers. It is based on Paul's letter to the Galatians, chapter 2 verse 9, where Paul says that three disciples of Jesus "gave me and Barnabas their right hands of fellowship" (Greek: δεξὰς ἔδωκαν ἐμοὶ καὶ Βαρναβᾷ κοινωνίας, dexas edōkan emoi kai Barnaba koinōnias), bonding them together as members of the new Christian church. John Stott follows the New English Bible in suggesting that the phrase means the other apostles "accepted Barnabas and myself as partners, and shook hands upon it." Herman Ridderbos, however, believes that the "giving of right hands represents more than a reciprocal acknowledgment or testimony of friendship: it suggests rather a covenant."

Interpreters reading Galatians 2:9 from a social-scientific perspective, thus considering the text in its 1st-century Mediterranean context, understand the gesture of James, Cephas, and John "extending the right hand of fellowship" to be a condescending gesture toward Paul and Barnabas. On this reading, the three Jerusalem apostles assert their superiority over Paul by offering a truce (end to hostilities) since, in that time and place, "extending the right hand" was not a gesture between equals. If this is correct, then the "right hand of fellowship" as it was iterated by Paul, reflects the disputatious character of early, emerging Christianity, and which came to a head (at least as far as Paul was concerned) as described in the "Incident at Antioch" (cf. Galatians 2:11–14).

Predating New Testament usage, Plato uses the phrase in his dialogue The Republic, Book V [468], suggesting it as something to be offered to "the hero who has distinguished himself".

The Right Hand of Christian Fellowship is a practice performed by many denominations of Christianity as an extension of brotherhood into the church. When celebrating the sacrament of Holy Communion, members of the Moravian Church give one another the Right Hand of Fellowship by shaking hands with other members of their congregation. This signifies "oneness in Christ and the desire to be at peace with one another." In many Methodist connexions such as the Allegheny Wesleyan Methodist Connection and Emmanuel Association of Churches, when a person who has experienced the New Birth desires to join a church, he or she must take the covenant and the current members vote the probationers into the congregation. Other groups that take an actual vote throughout its members include the Old Time Missionary Baptists. If the person is deemed eligible, then the church then extends the Right Hand of Christian Fellowship as an act of acceptance. This is typically done by having the person shake the right hand of every current member of the church.

Among the Congregational clergy of Puritan New England a new minister undergoing ordination, after he was called by the voting members of the church and submitted to the laying on of hands by ministers and sometimes lay elders of neighboring congregations, was often extended the right hand of fellowship by a prominent clergymen to formally seal his acceptance of the ministerial office.

The Right Hand of Fellowship can be used as a weekly greeting, similar to the passing of the peace used in liturgical churches.

Additionally, the Right Hand of Fellowship can be viewed as merely an expression of good faith and morals. In this scenario, there is less of a literal sense to the right hand.

== See also ==
- Handshake
