= Micropolygyria =

Brain disorder

- Other names: Polymicrogyria, Polygyria, or Microgyria
- Specialty: Neurology

Micropolygyria is a neuronal migration disorder, a developmental anomaly of the brain characterized by development of numerous small convolutions (microgyri), causing intellectual disability and/or other neurological disorders. It is present in a number of specific neurological diseases, notably multiple sclerosis and Fukuyama congenital muscular dystrophy, a specific disease cause by mutation in the Fukutin gene (FKTN).

== See also ==
- Glia limitans
