= Glia limitans =

Thin astrocyte membrane surrounding the brain and spinal cord

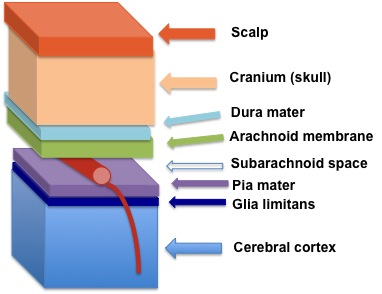
- The glia limitans (in dark blue) lies between the pia mater and the cerebral cortex

Details
- Parts: Astrocyte, Basal lamina

Identifiers
- Latin: Glia limitans
- NeuroLex ID: nlx_subcell_100209

The glia limitans, or the glial limiting membrane, is a thin barrier of astrocyte foot processes associated with the parenchymal basal lamina surrounding the brain and spinal cord. It is the outermost layer of neural tissue, and among its responsibilities is the prevention of the over-migration of neurons and neuroglia, the supporting cells of the nervous system, into the meninges. The glia limitans also plays an important role in regulating the movement of small molecules and cells into the brain tissue by working in concert with other components of the central nervous system (CNS) such as the blood–brain barrier (BBB).

== Location and structure ==
The perivascular feet of astrocytes form a close association with the basal lamina of the brain parenchyma to create the glia limitans. This membrane lies deep to the pia mater and the subpial space and surrounds the perivascular spaces (Virchow-Robin spaces). Any substance entering the central nervous system from the blood or cerebrospinal fluid (CSF) must cross the glia limitans.

The two different classifications of glial limiting membrane, the glia limitans perivascularis and the glia limitans superficialis, have nearly identical structures, however, they can be distinguished from each other by their location within the brain. The glia limitans perivascularis abuts the perivascular space surrounding the parenchymal blood vessels and functions as a supportive constituent of the blood–brain barrier. In contrast, the non-parenchymal blood vessels present in the subarachnoid space are not covered by the glia limitans. Instead, the entire subarachnoid space is sealed towards the nervous tissue by the glia limitans superficialis. These two parts of the glia limitans are continuous; however, convention dictates that the part that covers the surface of the brain is referred to as the superficialis, and the part that encloses the blood vessels within the brain is called the perivascularis.

== Function ==
=== Physical barrier ===
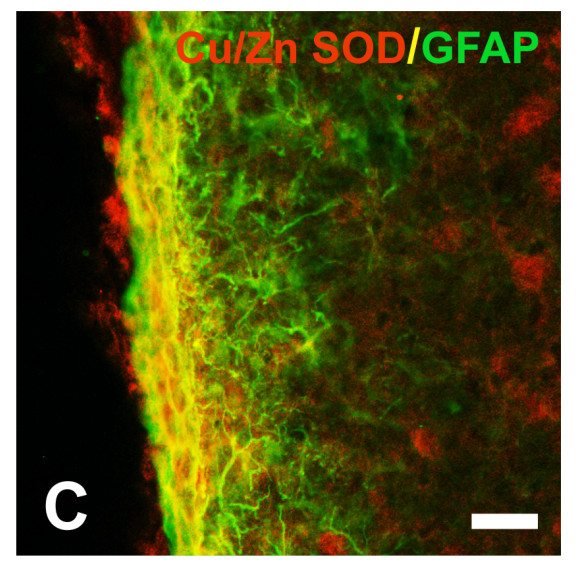
Copper/Zinc Superoxide Dismutase (Cu/Zn SOD), shown in orange, is an important factor in the brain's immune response. Here it is seen in close association with the glial fibrillary acidic protein (GFAP), an indicator of the presence of astrocytes, at the surface of the glial limitans

The main role of the glia limitans is to act as a physical barrier against unwanted cells or molecules attempting to enter the CNS. The glia limitans compartmentalizes the brain to insulate the parenchyma from the vascular and subarachnoid compartments. Within the brain, the glial limiting membrane is an important constituent of the blood–brain barrier. Experiments using electron-dense markers have discovered that functional components of the blood–brain barrier are the endothelial cells that compose the vessel itself. These endothelial cells contain highly impermeable tight junctions that cause the blood vessels of the brain to exhibit none of the “leakiness” found in arteries and veins elsewhere in the body. Through both in vivo and in vitro experiments the astrocytic foot processes of the glia limitans were shown to induce the formation of the tight junctions of the endothelial cells during brain development. The in vivo experiment involved harvested rat astrocytes that were placed into the anterior chamber of a chick-eye or on the chorioallantois. Permeable blood vessels from either the iris or chorioallantois became impermeable to blue-albumin once they had entered the transplanted bolus of astrocytes. In the in vitro experiment, endothelial cells were first cultured alone and the tight junctions were observed in freeze-fracture replicas to be discontinuous and riddled with gap junctions. Then, the brain endothelial cells were cultured with astroctytes resulting in enhanced tight junctions and a reduced frequency of gap junctions.

The glia limitans also acts as a second line of defense against anything that passes the blood–brain barrier. However, because the astrocytes surrounding the vessels are connected by gap junctions, it is not considered part of the BBB and material can readily pass between the foot processes.

=== Immunological barrier ===
The astrocytes of the glia limitans are responsible for separating the brain into two primary compartments. The first compartment is the immune-privileged brain and spinal cord parenchyma. This compartment contains multiple immunosuppressive cell surface proteins such as CD200 and CD95L and it allows for the release of anti-inflammatory factors. The second compartment is that of the non-immune-privileged subarachnoid, subpial, and perivascular spaces. This area is filled with pro-inflammatory factors such as antibodies, complement proteins, cytokines, and chemokines. The astrocytes of the glia limitans are believed to be the component of the brain that secretes the pro- and anti-inflammatory factors.

== Development ==
The development of the long astrocyte cellular processes that are integral to the glia limitans structure has been linked to the presence of meningeal cells in the pia mater. Meningeal cells are specialized fibroblast-like cells that surround the CNS and major blood vessels. They have been found to co-operate with astrocytes in the initial formation of the glia limitans during development and participate in its continued maintenance throughout life. Artificially induced destruction of meningeal cells during CNS development have been found to result in the alteration of subpial extracellular matrix and a disruption of the glia limitans.

The glia limitans has also proven to be important in the recovery of the CNS after injuries. When lesions are made on the brain surface, meningeal cells will divide and migrate into the lesion, eventually lining the entire injury cavity. If the injury has significantly reduced the density of astrocytes and created space within the tissue, the meningeal cells will invade even more diffusely. As invading meningeal cells make contact with astrocytes, they can induce the formation of a new, functional glia limitans. The new glia limitans formed after CNS injury usually presents itself as a barrier to regenerating axons.

== Clinical relevance ==
There are a number of diseases associated with problems or abnormalities with the glia limitans. Many diseases can arise from a breach to the glia limitans in which it will no longer be able to fulfill its functional role as a barrier. Two of the more common diseases resulting from a breach to the glia limitans are described below.

=== Fukuyama-type congenital muscular dystrophy ===
Breaches in the glia limitans-basal lamina complex have been associated with Fukuyama-type congenital muscular dystrophy (FCMD), which is thought to be the result of micropolygyri, or small protrusions of nervous tissue. Although the underlying mechanism for the formation of these breaches is largely unknown, recent research has indicated that the protein fukutin is directly linked to the developing lesions. Mutations in the fukutin protein lead to a depressed level of its expression in the brain and spinal cord of neonatal subjects, which in turn has been found to contribute to the weakening of the structural integrity of the glia limitans. Neuronal and glial cells migrate through the weakened barrier resulting in the accumulation of neural tissue in the subarachnoid space. This abnormal migration, known as cortical dysplasia, is theorized to be one of the primary causes for FCMD.

=== Experimental autoimmune encephalomyelitis ===
It has been demonstrated that the clinical signs of experimental autoimmune encephalomyelitis (EAE) are only evident after the penetration of inflammatory cells across the glia limitans and upon entrance into the CNS parenchyma. The activity of matrix metalloproteinases, specifically MMP-2 and MMP-9, are required for the penetration of the glia limitans by inflammatory cells. This is most likely due to the biochemistry of the parenchymal basement membrane and the astrocytic foot processes. MMP-2 and MMP-9 are both produced by myeloid cells, which surround T cells in the perivascular space. These metalloproteinases allow immune cells to breach the glia limitans and reach the CNS parenchyma to attack the CNS parenchymal cells. Once the immune cells have reached the CNS parenchyma and the immune attack is underway, the CNS parenchymal cells are sacrificed in order to battle the infection. The autoimmune response to EAE leads to chronic attack of oligodendrocytes and neurons, which promotes demyelination and axonal loss. This can ultimately result in the loss of CNS neurons.

== Comparative anatomy ==
Because the glia limitans serves such an important structural and physiological function in human beings, it is unsurprising that evolutionary precursors of the glial limiting membrane can be found in many other animals.

Insects have an open circulatory system, so there are no blood vessels found within their ganglia. However, they do have a sheath of perineurial glial cells that envelops the nervous system and exhibit the same tight occluding junctions that are induced by the glia limitans in humans. These cells act as a barrier and are responsible for establishing permeability gradients.

In certain molluscs, a glial-interstitial fluid barrier is observed without the presence of tight junctions. Cephalopod molluscs, in particular, have cerebral ganglia that have microcirculation, often seen in the composition of higher organisms. Often, the glial cells will form a seamless sheath completely around the blood space. The barrier consists of zonular intercellular junctions, rather than tight junctions, with clefts formed by extracellular fibrils. In addition to protection from the blood, these barriers are thought to exhibit local control of the microenvironment around specific neuron groups, a function required for complex nervous systems.

Monkeys and other primates have been found to have a glial limiting membrane extremely similar to humans. Studies on these animals have revealed that the thickness of the glia limitans not only varies greatly among different species, but also within different regions of the central nervous system of the same organism. Further observations of young and old monkeys have proven that the younger subjects have thinner membranes with fewer layers of astrocytic processes while the older monkeys possess much thicker membranes.

== Current research ==
As of 2011, research is focused on the two-way communication between neurons and glial cells. Communication between these two types of cells allows for axonal conduction, synaptic transmission, as well as the processing of information to regulate and better control the processes of the central nervous system. The various forms of communication include neurotransmission, ion fluxes and signaling molecules. As recently as 2002, new information on the process of neuron-glia communication was published by R. Douglas Fields and Beth Stevens-Graham. They used advanced imaging methods to explain that the ion channels seen in glial cells did not contribute to action potentials but rather allowed the glia to determine the level of neuronal activity within proximity. Glial cells were determined to communicate with one another solely with chemical signals and even had specialized glial-glial and neuron-glial neurotransmitter signaling systems. Additionally, neurons were found to release chemical messengers in extrasynaptic regions, suggesting that the neuron-glial relationship includes functions beyond synaptic transmission. Glia have been known to assist in synapse formation, regulating synapse strength, and information processing as mentioned above. The process for adenosine triphosphate (ATP), glutamate, and other chemical messenger release from glia is debated and is seen as a direction for future research.
