= Epignathus =

Type of tumor of the oropharynx

Epignathus is a rare teratoma of the oropharynx. Epignathus is a form of oropharyngeal teratoma that arises from the palate and, in most cases, results in death. The pathology is thought to be due to unorganized and uncontrolled differentiation of somatic cells leading to formation of the teratoma; sometimes it is also referred to as fetus in fetu, which is an extremely rare occurrence of an incomplete but parasitic fetus located in the body of its twin. This tumor is considered benign (non-cancerous) but life-threatening because of its atypical features (size, location, and rate of development) and high risk of airway obstruction, which is the cause of death in 80–100% of the cases at the time of delivery.

Despite the high mortality rate, the most important factor in improving survival probability is to detect and diagnose the lesion before birth using ultrasound and MRI scans. If undetected prenatally, the epignathus will be apparent immediately after birth, but prognosis will be poor due to lack of preparation and treatment plans. Most babies with epignathus have a poor prognosis due to late diagnosis and, subsequently, complications in securing the airway. However, with early detection and multidisciplinary healthcare teams, an adequate treatment plan to secure the baby's airway and surgically remove the lesion may improve the prognosis. Treatment options for this rare condition prioritize managing the risk of asphyxiation prior to deciding on an appropriate plan for the teratoma resection.

== Pathology ==
Teratomas, which are generally benign tumors, originate from stem cells, with the oropharynx (epignathus) region being the second most common location for head and neck teratomas. The tumor arises from the palato-pharyngeal region around the basisphenoid (Rathke's pouch), or most commonly the base of the skull. Epignathi are present from birth and has been shown to affect all three germ layers (ectodermal, mesodermal, and endodermal layers) and can include cartilage, bone, and fat. Case reports describe the possibility for an epignathus to present as an incompletely formed and parasitic fetal twin, which is called fetus in fetu. Many case reports about babies with epignathus have reported common malformations of cleft palate, and bifid tongue and/or nose. The tumor can grow within the oral cavity and protrude out of the mouth, causing obstruction of the airway and therefore mortality. This lesion may be associated with polyhydramnios – excessive amniotic fluid around the fetus – and typically prevents the fetus from swallowing the amniotic fluid. In rare cases, the tumor may extend into the cranial cavity, including into the brain, or it may become encapsulated in the cranial cavity and not enter the brain at all. Most neonates and young children who present with epignathus have exhibited benign tumors, in comparison to older children and adults who have presented with more malignant teratomas.

Recent findings have shown some genetic abnormalities associated with epignathi. There have been case reports noting chromosomal irregularities such as a 49,XXXXY karyotype, duplication of 1q and 19p, and ring X chromosome mosaicism. However, this theory is still inconclusive, as there have been other studies that have shown no chromosomal abnormalities.

== Epidemiology ==
Teratomas develop in the head and neck region with a live birth (fetus shows signs of life after leaving mother's womb) incidence of 1:20,000 to 40,000. Due to the rarity of epignathus, the information gathered regarding incidence and prevalence is sourced from case reports. The occurrence of epignathus, a teratoma of the oropharynx, is extremely rare, with a live birth incidence found to be 1:35,000 to 1:200,000. Of the reported cases, epignathus was found to be more common in females than in males (3:1 ratio); however, there is a lack of evidence demonstrating that an individual's genetic makeup will increase the likelihood of developing this form of teratoma. The studies have shown having one child with epignathus does not increase the chances of having pregnancies with this disease in the future. An estimated 10% of most epignathus diagnoses also report various epignathus-related abnormalities and deformities, such as the formation of a cleft palate (split in the mouth's roof due to abnormal fusing of the hard palate during fetal development), hemangiomas (pathological development of extra blood vessels).

== Diagnosis ==
Epignathus occurs at a critical location, which makes this tumor extremely dangerous and not resectable in newborn children. One of the primary modalities that can be used for diagnosing teratoma and epignathus is ultrasound. Diagnosis of epignathus may be made before the birth of the child by using ultrasound. Sonography evaluation is essential during pregnancy for diagnosing epignathus and, in some cases, surgically removing the teratoma while the child is still in the womb. One of the main characteristics of epignathus in the sonography evaluation is a relatively large mass that can be seen in the anterior or front side of the neck.

For diagnosing epignathus, radiography, which is an imaging tool for bones and skeleton, might not be beneficial, as no skeletal abnormalities have been noted in several cases of epignathus. Microscopic examination of the tumor may be of benefit. The microscopic examination focuses on the pattern of cell growth (histology). Because epignathus is a type of teratoma, it has a unique histological structure. Hence, the pattern found in microscopic examination can show a growth pattern consistent with teratoma. Another method that can be used to diagnose epignathus is karyotyping, which shows genetic abnormalities in the fetus. However, the parents' chromosomes are healthy, and there is no evidence of it being inherited genetically.

Epiganthus is a very rare condition that results in the studies on it to primarily be case studies. In some of these case reports, it was seen that the diagnosis of epignathus occurred as early as 17 weeks from conception. However, in other case studies, the ultrasound was normal at 17 weeks. If the tumor is small enough, it might appear at the delivery unpredicted or even later on, in a child. For example, in one case, epignathus was detected at week 28, which caused change in the structure of the face and airways, and the child was born in week 34 with Caesarean section and needed assistance for breathing. If the diagnosis of epignathus does not happen during pregnancy, and the baby survives to birth, even though it becomes immediately apparent, there is a low chance for survival. Other clinical features include dyspnoea, cyanosis, and difficulty in breathing, sucking and swallowing due to the presence of the tumor.

== Treatment ==
The main priority for treating epignathus is to establish a usable airway free of obstruction, and then to feed the baby. This is frequently difficult because there are often complications due to the large mass of the tumor, its location, the complex progression and required corrective modifications. These tumors, characterized as unusual masses or lumps of tissue, are often the result of abnormal tissue growth and may remain localized in one area or spread to other parts of the body.

However, diagnostic imaging tools such as 3-D ultrasonography and magnetic resonance imaging (MRI) have been essential in early detection of tumors in the head and neck region of the fetus. Although few cases have been treated successfully, early prenatal detection and intervention prior to birth has proven to be key in order to have a chance to save the baby's life.

3-D ultrasonography works to create an image by producing high frequency sound waves throughout the body in order to detect and receive echo sound. These echoes are then interpreted to form an image depending on how strong the echo was and how long the echo was received after the sound waves were transmitted. Compared to other imaging techniques that use radioactive dyes or ionizing radiation, ultrasounds have been considered safe. The use of 3-D ultrasonography has allowed surgeons to pinpoint the exact position of organs and tissues within the body and has been proven vital for surgical guidance especially when treating transplant and cancer. Magnetic resonance imaging (MRI) is another medical imaging technique that uses strong magnetic fields and radio waves to create images of organs and tissues within the body. MRI does not involve x-rays or ionizing radiation, which makes it a better and safer choice for medical imaging compared to CT and PET scans. The use of these diagnostic tools during fetal development are important for early detection of any abnormal masses that may turn out to be tumors.

If tumors are detected early using the featured diagnostic tools, the baby should be stabilized before surgical removal is conducted to repair the abnormalities. In order to stabilize the baby, the umbilical cord is kept intact to provide oxygen to the fetus in case of airway obstruction. This is important in the case that a tracheostomy – operation required to allow air to enter the lungs – is required in order to save the baby's life. Only after the airway is secured should the umbilical cord be clamped and the baby can proceed with surgery. During surgery, a complete repair and removal procedure of the diseased tissues, especially those that may spread throughout the body, is necessary in order to prevent any chance of reoccurrence after a period of improvement. Following surgery, chemotherapy may be used to promote residual tumor regression.

In some cases, because of the complications of the epignathus tumor, termination of the pregnancy might be an option that needs to get discussed.

== Prognosis ==
Epignathus diagnoses have a very poor prognosis or outcome with a death rate of 80–100% in newborn babies (either before delivery or shortly after delivery), primarily due to asphyxiation or suffocation from the tumor blocking the baby's airway. The course of the disease and outcome are dependent on many factors including size, location, and rate of development of the teratoma, all of which affect the magnitude of airway obstruction. Other complications such as the deformation of facial structure or deformation of jaw structure may impact the baby's ability to swallow and breathe, which may also negatively impact the prognosis as well. If the tumors are large, they might cause changes in the structure of face, nose and upper lips, to the point that they cannot be identified. Factors that may improve survival rates include early diagnosis of epignathus before birth, multidisciplinary management in preventing obstruction in the airways, and feasibility in surgical removal of the teratoma. The prognosis can result in broad range of outcomes. In some cases, pregnancies were terminated after the fetus was diagnosed with epignathus for different complications. The most common reason was that the tumor was continuing to spread even further in the head and mouth area.

Very few long term survivors have been reported, so the prognosis past the neonatal period is unclear.

== See also ==
- EXIT procedure
