= Ademption =

What happens when property in a will no longer exists at death

Ademption, or ademption by extinction, is a common law doctrine used in the law of wills to determine what happens when property bequeathed under a will is no longer in the testator's estate at the time of the testator's death. For a devise (bequest) of a specific item of property (a specific gift), such property is considered adeemed, and the gift fails. For example, if a will bequeathed the testator's car to a specific beneficiary, but the testator owned no car at the time of their death, the gift would be adeemed and the aforementioned beneficiary would receive no gift at all.

General bequests or general gifts – gifts of cash amounts – are never adeemed. If the cash in the testator's estate is not sufficient to satisfy the gift, then other assets in the residuary estate will need to be sold to raise the necessary cash.

Some property lies in a "gray" area, in which the testator's specific intent must be determined. For example, where the testator bequeathes "500 shares of stock" in a company, this may be read as a general bequest (that the estate should purchase and convey the particular stocks to the beneficiary), or it may be read as a specific bequest, particularly if the testator used a possessive ("my 500 shares"). Such a gift is deemed to be a demonstrative gift. Such demonstrative gifts are deemed to be a hybrid of both specific and general gifts. If one were to bequeath "500 shares of stock", most states would deem that to be a demonstrative gift. The resultant gift to the heir receiving "500 shares", would be the date of death value of 500 shares of that particular stock.

Ademption may be waived if the property leaves the estate after the testator has been declared incompetent. Furthermore, in some cases the beneficiary will be entitled to the proceeds from the sale of property, or to the insurance payout for property that is lost or destroyed.

To avoid confusion as to what may or may not be adeemed, sometimes the phrase "if owned by me at my death" is placed into the articles of a will in which property is being bequeathed.

As for the sale of land under an executory contract, traditional case law agrees that ademption occurs upon the death of the testator and that the proceeds of sale, when the closing occurs, should not pass to the specific devisee of the property. However, the more modern view and the Uniform Probate Code, which has been adopted by some U.S. jurisdictions, disagrees. These jurisdictions find that when property subject to specific devise is placed under contract of sale before the decedent's death, the proceeds of the sale will pass to the specific devisee.

== Statutory variations ==
Many U.S. jurisdictions have ameliorated the effects of the common law doctrine by statute.

In Wisconsin, state law (854.08) attempts to abolish the common law doctrine of ademption by extinction, by, for example, awarding beneficiaries the balance of the purchase price of the item sold (subject to some limitations).

In Virginia, ademption occurs with respect to most forms of property, but if the property at issue is stock certificates, then the buyout of the issuer of the stock by another company, and the swapping of the stocks for a new issue by that company, will not adeem the gift of stock. Similarly, if the shares of stock that existed at the time the gift was made have split (for example, where the holder of 500 shares receives a reissue of 1,000 shares each having half the value of the original), then the beneficiary of that gift will be entitled to the number of shares that exist after the split.
