= Chromophobia =

Fear or aversion of colors

- Other names: Chromatophobia
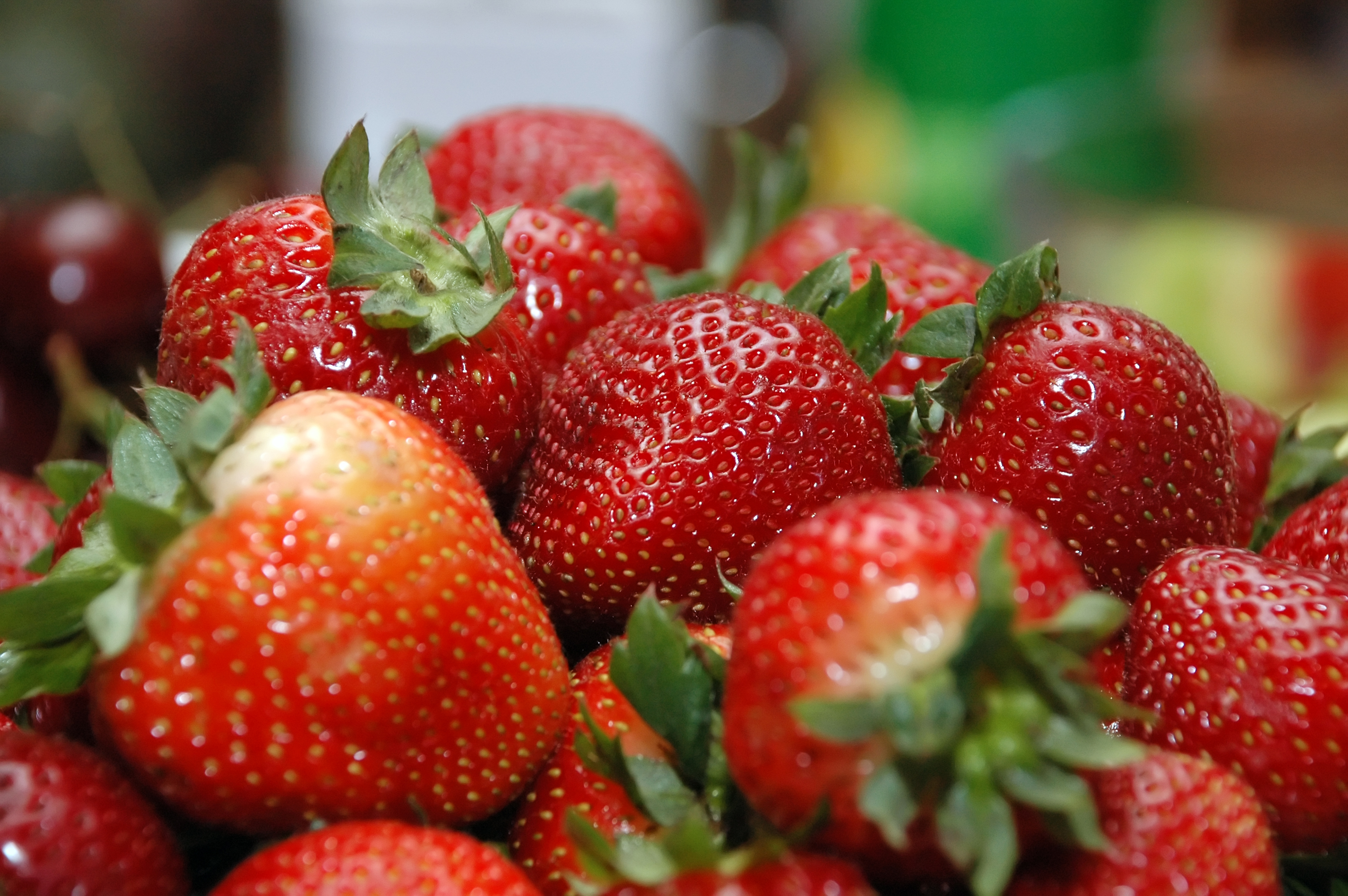
- The fear of the color red is called erythrophobia.
- Specialty: Psychology

Chromophobia (also known as chromatophobia) is a persistent, irrational fear of, or aversion to, colors and is usually a conditioned response. While actual clinical phobias to color are rare, colors can elicit hormonal responses and psychological reactions.

Chromophobia may also refer to an aversion of use of color in products or design. Within cellular biology, "chromophobic" cells are a classification of cells that do not attract hematoxylin, and is related to chromatolysis.

== Terminology ==
Names exist that mean fear of specific colors such as erythrophobia for the fear of red, xanthophobia for the fear of yellow and leukophobia for the fear of white. A fear of the color red may be associated with a fear of blood.

== Overview ==
In his book Chromophobia published in 2000, David Batchelor says that in Western culture, color has often been treated as corrupting, foreign or superficial. Michael Taussig states that the cultural aversion to color can be traced back a thousand years, with Batchelor stating that it can be traced back to Aristotle's privileging of line over color.

In a study, hatchling loggerhead sea turtles were found to have an aversion to lights in the yellow wave spectrum which is thought to be a characteristic that helps orient themselves toward the ocean. The Mediterranean sand smelt, Atherina hepsetus, has shown an aversion to red objects placed next to a tank while it will investigate objects of other colors. In other experiments, geese have been conditioned to have adverse reactions to foods of a particular color, although the reaction was not observed in reaction to colored water.

The title character in Alfred Hitchcock's Marnie has an aversion to the color red caused by a trauma during her childhood which Hitchcock presents through expressionistic techniques, such as a wash of red coloring a close up of Marnie.

The term colorphobia can also be used to refer to its literal etymological origin to refer to an apprehension towards image processing on one's vision and its visual perceptual property. However, the term's association with a racial component has been used by public figures such as Frederick Douglass.

Leukophobia often takes the form of a fixation on pale skin. Those with the phobia may make implausible assumptions such as paleness necessarily representing ill health or a ghost. In other cases, leukophobia is directed more towards the symbolic meaning of whiteness, for instance in individuals who associate the color white with chastity and are opposed to or fear chastity. In Paul Beatty's novel Slumberland, leukophobia refers to racism.

== Variations ==
These words are uncommon even in medicine; some are only found in lists of exotic words.

Show
Chrysophobia	fear of the color orange
Chlorophobia	fear of the color green
Cyanophobia	fear of the color blue
Erythrophobia	fear of the color red, maroon, and also of blushing
Glaucophobia	fear of the color gray
Kastanophobia	fear of the color brown
Leukophobia	fear of the color white
Melanophobia	fear of the color black
Porphyrophobia	fear of the color purple
Rhodophobia	fear of the color pink and rose
Xanthophobia	fear of the color yellow

== See also ==
- List of phobias
