= Heterocrine gland =

Gland with both exocrine and endocrine function

Heterocrine glands (also known as mixed glands) are the glands which function as both exocrine gland and endocrine gland. These include the pancreas and the gonads (testes and ovaries).
