= Barostat =

Device used to maintain pressure

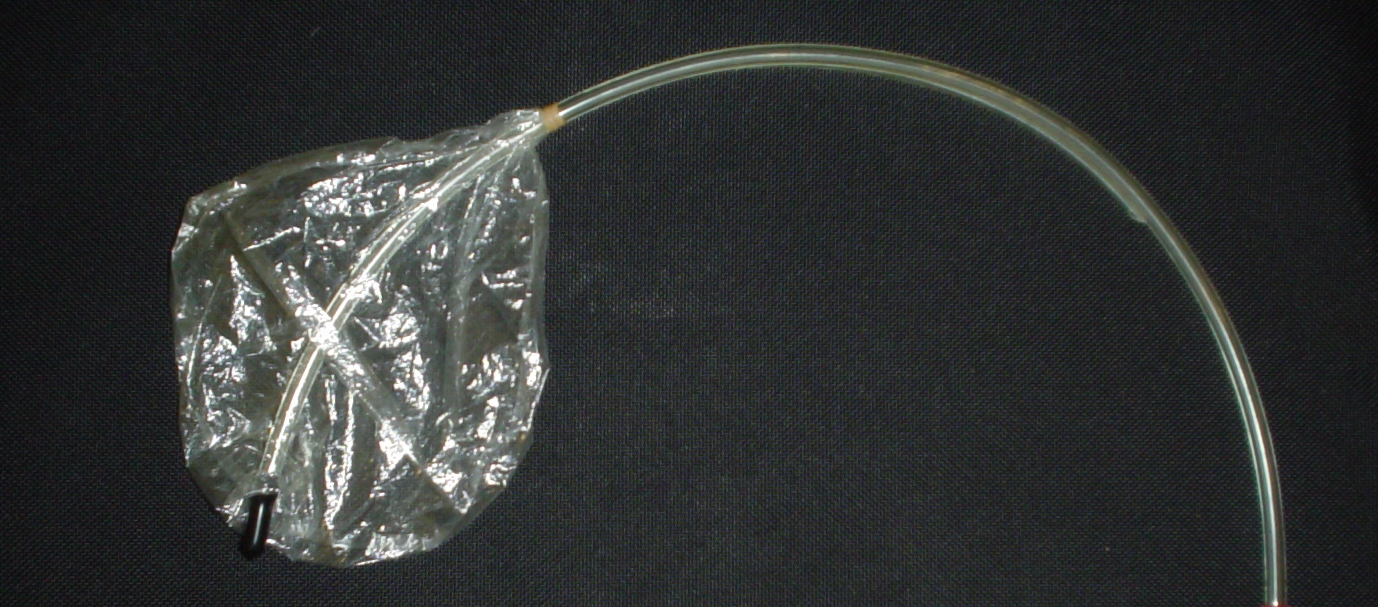
Rectal barostat balloon, partially inflated

A barostat is a device used to maintain constant pressure in a closed chamber. Its main principle is providing constant pressures in a balloon by means of a pneumatic pump. Barostats are frequently used in neurogastroenterology research, where they are used for measuring gut wall tension or sensory thresholds in the gut.

A specially designed instrument is needed in neurogastroenterology research since the gut wall has an outstanding capacity to expand and contract spontaneously and by reflex. When this occurs, a balloon placed anywhere in the gut has to be inflated or deflated very rapidly in order to maintain a constant pressure in this balloon.

Barostat-balloon systems have been used anywhere in the gut, including the esophagus, stomach, small bowel, colon, and the rectum ampulla.

Computer-driven barostats have widely been used to assess sensation and pain thresholds in the gut. Assessment of pain thresholds in the ampulla recti has been proposed as diagnostic measure in irritable bowel syndrome.

== See also ==
- Enteric nervous system
- Gut (zoology)
