= Amphibolic =

Metabolic pathway involving both catabolism and anabolism

The term amphibolism (Ancient Greek: ἀμφίβολος, romanized: amphibolos, lit. 'ambiguous, struck on both sides') is used to describe a biochemical pathway that involves both catabolism and anabolism. Catabolism is a degradative phase of metabolism in which large molecules are converted into smaller and simpler molecules, which involves two types of reactions. First, hydrolysis reactions, in which catabolism is the breaking apart of molecules into smaller molecules to release energy. Examples of catabolic reactions are digestion and cellular respiration, where sugars and fats are broken down for energy. Breaking down a protein into amino acids, or a triglyceride into fatty acids, or a disaccharide into monosaccharides are all hydrolysis or catabolic reactions. Second, oxidation reactions involve the removal of hydrogens and electrons from an organic molecule. Anabolism is the biosynthesis phase of metabolism in which smaller simple precursors are converted to large and complex molecules of the cell. Anabolism has two classes of reactions. The first are dehydration synthesis reactions; these involve the joining of smaller molecules together to form larger, more complex molecules. These include the formation of carbohydrates, proteins, lipids and nucleic acids. The second are reduction reactions, in which hydrogens and electrons are added to a molecule. Whenever that is done, molecules gain energy.

The term amphibolic was proposed by B. Davis in 1961 to emphasise the dual metabolic role of such pathways. These pathways are considered to be central metabolic pathways which provide, from catabolic sequences, the intermediates which form the substrate of the metabolic processes.

== Reactions exist as amphibolic pathway ==
All the reactions associated with synthesis of biomolecule converge into the following pathway, viz., glycolysis, the Krebs cycle and the electron transport chain, exist as an amphibolic pathway, meaning that they can function anabolically as well as catabolically.

Other important amphibolic pathways are the Embden-Meyerhof pathway, the pentose phosphate pathway and the Entner–Doudoroff pathway.

=== Embden-Meyerhoff ===
The Embeden–Meyerhof pathway and the Krebs cycle are the centre of metabolism in nearly all bacteria and eukaryotes. They provide not only energy but also precursors for biosynthesis of macromolecules that make up living systems.

=== Citric acid cycle ===
The citric acid cycle (Krebs cycle) is a good example of an amphibolic pathway because it functions in both the degradative (carbohydrate, protein, and fatty acid) and biosynthetic processes. The citric acid cycle occurs on the cytosol of bacteria and within the mitochondria of eukaryotic cells. It provides electrons to the electron transport chain which is used to drive the production of ATP in oxidative phosphorylation. Intermediates in the citric acid cycle, such as oxaloacetate, are used to synthesize macromolecule constituents such as amino acids, e.g. glutamate and aspartate.

The first reaction of the cycle, in which oxaloacetate (a four-carbon compound) condenses with acetate (a two-carbon compound) to form citrate (a six-carbon compound) is typically anabolic. The next few reactions, which are intramolecular rearrangements, produce isocitrate. The following two reactions, namely the conversion of D-isocitrate to α-Ketoglutarate followed by its conversion to succinyl-CoA, are typically catabolic. Carbon dioxide is lost in each step and succinate (a four-carbon compound) is produced.

There is an interesting and critical difference in the coenzymes used in catabolic and anabolic pathways; in catabolism NAD+ serves as an oxidizing agent when it is reduced to NADH. Whereas in anabolism the coenzyme NADPH serves as the reducing agent and is converted to its oxidized form NADP^{+}.

Citric acid cycle has two modes that play two roles, the first being energy production produced by the oxidative mode, as the acetyl group of acetyl-coA is fully oxidized to CO_{2}. This produces most of the ATP in the metabolism of aerobic heterotrophic metabolism, as this energy conversion in the membrane structure (cytoplasmic membrane in bacteria and mitochondria in eukaryotes) by oxidative phosphorylation by moving electron from donor (NADH and FADH_{2}) to the acceptor O_{2}. Every cycle give 3 NADH, 1 FADH_{2}, CO_{2} and GTP. The second role is biosynthetic, as citric acid cycle regenerate oxaloacetate when cycle intermediates are removed for biosynthesis.

Figure 1: Citric acid cycle

=== Pentose phosphate pathway ===
The pentose phosphate pathway gets its name because it involves several intermediates that are phosphorylated five-carbon sugars (pentoses). This pathway provides monomers for many metabolic pathways by transforming glucose into the four-carbon sugar erythrose and the five-carbon sugar ribose; these are important monomers in many metabolic pathways. Many of the reactants in this pathway are similar to those in glycolysis, and both occur in cytosol. The ribose-5-phosphate can be transported into the nucleic acid metabolism, producing the basis of DNA and RNA monomers, the nucleotides. In meristematic cells, large amounts of DNA must be produced during the S-phase of a short cell cycle; this pathway is an extremely important part of the metabolism of these cells. In these cells, the pentose phosphate pathway is active and shifted in favor of ribose production.

=== Entner-Doudoroff pathway ===
The Entner-Doudoroff pathway is a glycolytic pathway that is considered the second pathway used for carbohydrates used by certain microbes. In this process, glucose-6-phosphate is oxidized through 6-phosphogluconate to pyruvate and glyceraldehyde 3-phosphate, with the concomitant reduction of NADP. By conventional glyceraldehyde-3-phosphate oxidation to pyruvate, one NAD is reduced and a net one ATP is formed. In that pathway, for every glucose molecule there is an "investment" of one ATP molecule and a yield of two ATP and two pyruvate molecules and one NADH. The difference between the glycolytic used by humans and this pathway is that the latter requires one ATP to yield two ATP and two pyruvates as a net of only one NADPH produced and one ATP result (from substrate-level phosphorylation), and the former requires two ATP molecules to yield four ATP and two pyruvate molecules per glucose as a net of two ATP molecules.

Figure 2: Entner- Doudoroff pathway

== Regulation ==
The cell determines whether the amphibolic pathway will function as an anabolic or catabolic pathway by enzyme–mediated regulation at a transcriptional and post-transcriptional level. As many reactions in amphibolic pathways are freely reversible or can be bypassed, irreversible steps that facilitate their dual function are necessary. The pathway uses a different enzyme for each direction for the irreversible step in the pathway, allowing independent regulation of catabolism and anabolism. Due their inherent duality, amphibolic pathways represent the regulation modes of both anabolic by its negative feedback end product and catabolic by feedback by energy indicator sequences.
