= Eccentrism =

Eccentrism was an avant-garde artistic movement in the Soviet Union active during the 1920s. In the early 1920s it was a movement in theatre associated with the factory of the eccentric actor (FEKS), which rejected traditional theatrical acting in favor of a modern and physical performance incorporating shocking stunts, derived from the circus and other popular entertainment. A school of eccentrist cinema emerged from the theatre group in the later 20s. Sergei Eisenstein was briefly associated with the movement.

== Eccentrism in theatre ==
In Russian, the word eccentric was used as a term of art for circus performers, referring to the tricks performed for the audience. In 1921 the young directors Grigory Kozintsev, Leonid Trauberg, Sergei Yutkevich, and Gregory Kryzhitsky formed the theatre workshop “factory of the eccentric actor” (Fabrika Ekstsentricheskogo Aktera, or FEKS), in Petrograd. It was one of a plethora of avant-garde artists groupings blossoming in this period which attempted to respond to the faster paces of modernity within the openings perceived after the 1917 revolution. FEKS in particular advocated “an illogical performance style modeled on the physicality of circus stunts”, as well as on the popularity of American cinema of the period, such as Charlie Chaplin.

The December 1921 manifesto of the eccentric theater “Ekstsentrism” pronounced: “1) for the actor—from emotion to the machine, from anguish to the trick. The technique—circus…. 2) for the director—a maximum of devices, a record number of inventions, a turbine of rhythms. 3) for the dramatist—a composer of tricks. 4) for the artist—decoration in jumps.” In true Futurist fashion the manifesto demanded the abandonment of the old culture, and was handed out on the streets of St. Petersburg.

In New Worlds, Russian Art and Society, David Elliott states that “Eccentricism was a logical development from the alogical thought of the futurists. Artists introduced absurd elements or breaks in logic into their work in order to restructure and reorientate reality.” In July 1922 the main participants in FEKS expanded on the Eccentrist manifesto, and cited as parents of the movement, street language, circus posters, negro jazz bands, cinema, the music hall, the circus and boxing. Key to eccentrism in action was “synthesis of movements: acrobatic, gymnastic, balletic, constructivist-mechanical,” to give “the BASIC TEMPO of the epoch.”

It was not till September 1922 that FEKS put on its first public performance, based loosely on Nikolai Gogol's Marriage, but titled “Wedlock (Not from Gogol): A Stunt in Three Acts”. The playbill promised “Eccentrism presents: operetta, melodrama, farce, movies, circuses, variety, puppetry in a single performance!” According to contemporary reviews, the two main characters, scientists Albert and Einstein, “were played by circus eccentrics Serge and Taurek”, to “the utter delight of the audience.” “Eccentrism was the principle of organization of the entire spectacle”, with the actors joined by a dancer and a crowd of marchers.

In “The Future of FEKS” of 1923, Sergy Radlov announced that, from this season, “FEKS will carry on work as an independent studio within the Petroproketkul’t”, the Petrograd manifestation of the new Soviet Proletkult federation dedicated to revolutionary working-class aesthetic production. It was in this form that the group produced the Cocteau-influenced Foreign Trade on the Eiffel Tower (1923). By then, the group included well-known theatrical figures such as, SG Martinson, FF Knorre, as well as the dancer and silent film actress Z. Tarkhovskaya.

Despite the stated links with the circus, a sympathetic critic, Vladimir Nedobrovo, wrote in 1928 that “the Eccentrism of the FEKS is not the same as the eccentrism of the music hall” and is concerned with opening up stilted perception through “impeded form” and “alienation of the object” from its automatic state, a vision which owed something to Russian Formalist poetics. Yutkevich went further, and claimed its “aim was the final destruction of the bourgeois world.”

The young Sergi Eisenstein (then associated with the more mechanized aesthetic of Meyerhold's acting workshop) was introduced to FEKS by Sergi Yutkevich in 1922. He was strongly under its influence when he produced his first major work for the theater, The Montage of Attractions (1923), and worked with Tretiakov on The Wiseman, shown in the Moscow Proletkult Theatre in 1923. While FEKS cited Chaplin's cinema as an influence on their theater, and Eisenstein was influenced by FEKS theater in his later films, both took pains to distinguish the methods of fiction film from those of theater, unlike Meyerhold, who moved to merge their styles. Viktor Shklovsky wrote of the impossible, unexpected, and “eccentric” effects in Eisenstein's 1925 film, Strike.

== Eccentrism in film ==
Out of the FEKS theater, a new film-making group was being formed. They were concerned not just with “the selection of memorial moments” in the words of contemporary Russian Formalist critic Viktor Shklovsky, but “a new, non-automatic connection between them.” This paralleled Eisenstein's ideas of a “montage of attraction.” The motivation behind this was summed up by Shklovsky in 1928: “Eccentrism is a struggle with the monotony of life, a rejection of its traditional conception and presentation.”

However, Eisenstein soon broke with eccentrism to theorize his notion of “the attraction” in theatre and film as including, but going beyond, the “stunt” and the “trick,” on their own, in favor of a structure based on the ideological reactions of the audience. Dziga Vertov was also to move beyond eccentrism in his work, declaring in his 1926 “The Factory of Facts” that cinema should be “Not a FEKS (the Leningrad Factory of the Eccentric Actor), nor Eisenstein’s ‘factory of attractions’” but “a factory of facts.”

Between 1924 and 1929 FEKS produced five films under the banner of eccentrism. At this point, the Soviet Cinema Week reported the FEKS collective as having twenty-five members, including Leonid Trauberg and Grigorii Kozintsev as co-directors, Hungarian communist Evgenii Enei as art director and the important addition of Andrei Moskvin as cinematographer/cameraman. Their films were famous for exaggerated body movements, comedic acting, and extrovert character psychology. The first FEKS film was the 1924 Pokhozhdeniya Oktyabriny (The Adventures of an Octoberite) an agitational spectacle featuring a farcical villain and a chase scene set in the cupula of Petrograd's Saint Isaac's Cathedral. The film's combination of comedic entertainment and propaganda received a positive reaction from audience and critics, but, “it marked the end of the FEKS passion for the bizarre as a self-sufficient artistic objective.”

In a following film, Chertovo kolesco (the Devil's Wheel, 1926), a love scene unfolds on a switchback in front of a funfair. Kozintsev described their film as based on the idea that “everything must be active.” While the popular funfair background is enticing, and reflects the spirit of the FEKS manifesto, in the film the carnival is seen as a vacation from more serious Bolshevik pursuits of building a new world, and so can be seen as an ideological self-criticism of earlier FEKS fascinations.

The same could be said of the 1927 film S.V.D. where the “trickster” character served in the plot as a counter revolutionary bad character, questioning the solid identification of the FEKS aesthetic with the eccentric clown.

In these films, technology was seen as on the side of a progressive modernism, but by FEKS last film, the 1929 Novyi Vavilon (New Babylon) featuring the uprising and suppression of the Paris Commune, impersonal machinery in the form of guns are on the side of oppression. In form, the sharp focus of Pokhozhdeniya Oktyabriny has given way to a diffuse cinematography using smoke, diffusion disks or Vaseline on the lens. The change in attitude towards the machine aesthetic parallels the degeneration of the Russian Revolution, and the film received an unfavorable critical reception.

== Eccentrism’s demise ==
In its development from the 1921 manifesto, Eccentrism was faced with many crossroads; the aesthetic traditions of popular theatrical entertainment and the new cinema; silent and sound film, and avant-garde experimentation and socialist realism, all within the quickly changing ideas of the role of art in the 20s. By 1928 film production was effectively subsumed under the control of the state, and the soviet government was increasingly under the bureaucratic control of Joseph Stalin. Eccentrism, as with many of the early Soviet Avant-Garde movements, was not to survive the move to the state-sponsored “Socialist Realism.” In the late 1940s and early 1950s, Grigory Kozintsev, a founding member of FEKS theatre who had moved to FEKS filmmaking, produced more conventional stagings of Shakespeare at the Pushkin Theater in Leningrad (formerly Petrograd). He later made movies of Don Quixote (1957) and Hamlet (1964).
