= Barognosis =

Barognosis, or baresthesia, is the ability to evaluate the weight of objects, or to differentiate objects of different weights, by holding or lifting them. It is the opposite of abarognosis, the inability to evaluate the weight of objects. This sensory information is transmitted by the posterior column-medial lemniscus pathway of the spinal cord, which also carries the sensations of fine touch, stereognosis, tactile pressure, graphesthesia, texture recognition, kinesthesia, two-point discrimination, proprioception, and vibration.

To test for intact barognosis, a set of small objects with the same size and shape but of graduated weight is used. A series of different weights can be placed one at a time in the same hand, and the patient is asked to identify the comparative weight of the objects, i.e. by saying whether the object is "heavier" or "lighter". Other methods for testing include different weights being placed in each hand simultaneously, or having the patient pick up each weight using a fingertip grip.
