= Quadricuspid aortic valve =

- Specialty: Cardiology
- Diagnostic method: Transthoracic echocardiogram, short-axis ultrasound
- Treatment: Aortic valve replacement

A quadricuspid aortic valve (QAV) is a rare congenital heart defect characterized by the presence of four cusps, instead of the usual three found normally in the aortic valve. It is a defect that occurs during embryological development of the aortic trunk during gestation. There is an increased risk of developing post-natal aortic regurgitations and other heart-related diseases; therefore patients with the condition should be carefully monitored.

== Signs and symptoms ==
=== Complications ===
Dilated left ventricle and aortic root in patient with quadricuspid aortic valve.

The most common complications of QAV are aortic regurgitations. This is caused by the inadequate closing of the four cusps at the end of systole. The fourth dysplastic cusp is incapable of fully closing the aortic annulus, which causes a backflow of blood through the aortic valve. Using transthoracic echocardiograms, 3-D TEE and ECG traces, it is also possible to find left ventricular hypertrophy, bundle branch blocks, and abnormal displacement of the ostium in the right coronary artery in association with QAV. Some research has shown increased incidence of atrial fibrillation to be associated but this relationship is not yet clearly established.

== Diagnosis ==
Previously, diagnosis was usually done through autopsy. Advances in imaging technologies allow for early detection and thus ample treatment and monitoring of the affected patient. A short-axis ultrasound of the aortic valve allows for the best view of the aortic valve, and gives a clear indication of the adduction pattern of the aortic valves.

If an “X” shape is seen, then the patient can be diagnosed with having a quadricuspid aortic valve. A transthoracic echocardiogram (TTE) indicates if there is an aortic regurgitation, but a 3-D transesophageal echocardiogram can give a better view of the aortic valve.

Multidetector coronary CT angiography has been indicated as a single competent diagnostic imaging tool capable of delineating valvular anatomy, severity of regurgitation, and high risk coronary problems.

=== Classification ===
There have been seven described variations of the quadricuspid aortic valve according to Hurwitz and Robert’s classification. They are classified on a scale from A to G and describe the variations in size of the four cusps. The most common variation is that of B – three equal-sized cusps and one smaller cusp. There is no correlation between the anatomy and functional status of the aortic cusps.

== Treatment ==
The typical method of treatment is through surgery such as Aortic valve reconstruction surgery (AVRS) and aortic valve replacement, usually with a synthetic valve.

== Incidence ==
Quadricuspid aortic valves are very rare cardiac valvular anomalies with a prevalence of 0.013% to 0.043% of cardiac cases and a prevalence of 1 in 6000 patients that undertake aortic valve surgery. There is a slight male predominance in all of the cases, and the mean age is 50.7.
