= Abarognosis =

- Other names: Baragnosis, baroagnosis

Abarognosis is a type of cortical sensory defect consisting of a loss of barognosis, the ability to detect the weight of an object held in the hand or to tell the difference in weight between two objects, or more succinctly "loss of the ability to sense weight". This deficit may be caused by damage to the parietal lobe.
