= Koinonos =

Koinonos (Ancient Greek: κοινωνός) is an Ancient Greek word, generally thought to mean companion; however it has been used extensively in ancient writing with a wide variety of meanings. Its original form is κοινωνός and it was later translated to Koinonos. One can read it as "koy-no-nos". It can mean married partner, business partner, friend or companion in faith as well. It is generally used with reference to "sharing". It has been used in the Gospel of Philip to note the relationship between Jesus and Mary Magdalene.
