= List of Greek and Latin roots in English/C =

All Latin and Greek roots beginning with C

Lists of Greek and Latin roots in English beginning with other letters:
- A
- B
- C
- D
- E
- F
- G
- H
- I
- J
- K
- L
- M
- N
- O
- P
- Q
- R
- S
- T
- U
- V
- X
- Z

== C ==
Root	Meaning in English	Origin language	Etymology (root origin)	English examples
cac-, kak-	bad	Greek	κακός (kakós), κάκιστος (kákistos)	cachexia, cacistocracy, cacodemon, cacoepy, cacography, cacophobia, cacophobe, cacophobic, cacophonous, cacophony, cacorrhacitis, kakistocracy, kakistocrat
cad-, -cid-, cas-	fall	Latin	cadere, casus	accidence, accident, accidental, cadaver, cadaverine, cadaverous, cadence, cadency, cadent, cadential, cadenza, caducity, caducous, cascade, case, casual, casualty, casuistry, chance, cheat, chute, coincide, coincidence, coincident, coincidental, decadence, decadent, decay, decidua, decidual, deciduate, deciduation, deciduous, demicadence, escheat, escheatable, escheatage, escheatment, escheator, incidence, incident, incidental, nonaccidental, nondeciduous, nonincidental, parachute, postaccident, procidentia, recidivous, semelincident
caed-, -cid-, caes-, -cis-	cut, kill	Latin	caedere, caesus	caespitose, caesura, cement, cementation, cementitious, cementum, cespitose, chisel, circumcise, circumcision, concise, concision, decidability, decidable, decide, decision, decisive, deciso, excide, excise, excision, excisional, fungicide germicide, genocide, herbicide homicide, imprecise, imprecision, incise, incision, incisive, incisor, incisory, incisure, indecision, indecisive, occision, pesticide, précis, precise, precision, scissors, semidecidable, succise, succision, suicide
cal-, call-	beautiful	Greek	καλός (kalós) "beautiful"; κάλλος (kállos) "beauty", κάλλιστος (kállistos)	calisthenics, calligraphy, Callista, Callisto, calophyllous, kaleidoscope
cal-	call	Latin	calare	calendar, claim, class, conciliate, conciliatory, council, intercalate, nomenclature
cal-	heat	Latin	calere, calor "heat"	caldarium, caldera, calefacient, calefaction, calefactive, calefactory, calenture, calescent, calid, calor, calore, caloric, calorie, calorifacient, calorific, calorigenic, calorimeter, caudle, cauldron, chafe, chafery, chalder, chaldron, chaud-froid, chauffer, chauffeur, chauffeuse, decalescence, decalescent, nonchalance, nonchalant, recalescence, scald
calc-	calcium, stone	Latin and Greek	from Latin calx (genitive calcis) "lime", from Greek χάλιξ (khálix) "pebble", "limestone"	calcite, calcitrant, calcium, calculate, calculus, chalicothere, chalk, recalcitrant
calv-, calum-	trick, lie, deceive	Latin	calumnia "slander, trickery", from calvi "to trick, deceive"	calumnious, calumny, cavil, challenge
calyp-	cover	Greek	καλύπτειν (kalúptein), καλυπτός (kaluptós), κάλυξ, κάλυκος (kálux, kálukos)	apocalypse, apocalyptic, apocalypticism, calyce, calyptra, Calyptrogyne, calyx, epicalyx, eucalypt, eucalyptus
cameria-	vault	Latin	camera	antechamber, bicameral, camaraderie, camber, camera, chamber, chamberlain, comrade, concamerate, concameration, multicamera, tricameral, unicameral
camiso-	shirt	Latin	camisia	camisade, camisado, Camisard, camisole, chemise
camp-	field	Latin	campus "field", "level ground"	camp, campaign, campesino, campestral, campicolous, campimetry, campo, campsite, campus, champertous, champerty, champignon, champion, decamp, decampment, encamp, encampment
can-	dog	Latin	canis	canaille, canary, canicular, canicule, canid, canine, Canis, Canis Major, postcanine
can-	reed, rod	Greek	κάννα (kánna), κανών (kanṓn)	cane, canister, canon, canonic
can-, -cin-, cant-, -cent-	sing	Latin	canere, cantus	accent, accentual, accentuate, accentuation, canción, canorous, cant, cantabile, cantata, cantation, cantatory, cantatrice, canticle, canticum, cantiga, cantilena, cantillate, cantillation, cantion, canto, cantor, cantus, canzona, canzone, Carmen, chanson, chansonnier, chant, chanteur, chanteuse, chanticleer, charm, concent, descant, discant, discantus, disenchant, disenchantment, disencharm, disincentive, enchant, enchantment, enchantress, incantation, incantational, incentive, plainchant, precentor, recant, recantation, succentor, vaticinate, vaticination, vaticinator
cand-, cend-	glowing, iridescent	Latin	candere "to be white or glisten"	candela, candid, candidate, candle, candor, incandescent, incendiary, incense
cap-, -cip-, capt-, -cept-	hold, take	Latin	capere, captus "take or hold" (vowel changes from a to i in compounds)	capable, capacious, captive, caption, captivate, capture, conception, except, forceps, incipient, intercept, recipient
capit-, -cipit-	head	Latin	caput, capitis	achievable, achieve, achievement, ancipital, ancipitous, biceps, bicipital, cabotage, cad, caddie, cadet, cape, capital, capitular, capitulate, capitulation, captain, chapter, chaptrel, chattel, chef, chief, chieftain, co-captain, co-captaincy, decapitate, decapitation, occipital, occiput, precipitation, precipitous, quadriceps, recap, recapitulate, sincipital, sinciput, sous-chef, subcaptain, triceps, tricipital, unicipital, vice-captain, vice-captaincy
capn-	smoke	Greek	καπνός (kapnós), καπνόομαι	capnogram, capnograph, capnography, capnolagnia, capnomancy, capnometer, capnometry, capnomor, capnophile, hypercapnia, hypocapnia
capr-	goat	Latin	caper (genitive capri) "goat", also capreolus "wild goat"	cab, caper, caprice, Capricorn, caprine
caps-	box, case	Latin	capsa	capsule
carbon-	coal	Latin	carbo, carbonis	bicarbonate, carbon, carbonara, carbonate, carbonation, Carboniferous, carbuncle, radiocarbon
carcer-	jail	Latin	carcer, carcerare, cancelli	chancel, chancellery, chancellor, chancery, incarcerate, incarceration, subchancel
carcin-	cancer (disease)	Latin from Greek	Latin from Greek καρκίνος (karkínos) "crab"	carcinogenic, carcinoma
cardi-	heart	Greek	καρδιά (kardiá)	cardiac, cardialgia, cardiograph, cardioid, cardiologist, cardiology, cardiomegaly, cardiomyopathy, cardioplegia, cardioplegic, cardiospasm, electrocardiogram, electrocardiography, endocardium, epicardium, hemicardia, myocardium, neurocardiology, pericardium
cardin-	hinge	Latin	cardo, cardinis	cardinal, cardinality, kern
carn-	flesh	Latin	caro, carnis	carnage, carnal, carnality, carnary, carnate, carnation, carneous, carnival, carnivore, carnose, carnosity, carrion, caruncle, carunculate, charcuterie, charnel, discarnate, incarnadine, incarnate, incarnation, reincarnate, reincarnation
carp-	fruit	Greek	καρπός (karpós)	acarpous, acrocarpous, amphicarpous, angiocarpous, anisocarpic, Carpo, carpogonium, carpology, carpophagous, carpophore, carpospore, cystocarp, dipterocarp, endocarp, epicarp, exocarp, Karpos, mericarp, mesocarp, monocarpic, pericarp, polycarpic, procarp, pseudocarp
carp-	wrist	Greek	καρπός (karpós)	carpal, carpal tunnel syndrome, carpus, metacarpus
cast-	pure, cut	Latin	castrare and castus, from kes- (to cut)	caste, castigate, castrate, chaste, chastity, incest
cata-, cat-	down, against, back	Greek	κατά (katá) "down, against, back"	catabolic, catacomb, catalyst, catarrhine, catastrophe, catatonia, cathode, cation
caten-	chain	Latin	catena	catenary, concatenation
cathar-	pure	Greek	καθαρός (katharós)	catharsis, cathartic
caud-	tail	Latin	cauda	caudal, coda
caus-, -cus-	cause or motive	Latin	causa	accuse, because, causal, causative, cause, excuse
caust-, caut-	burn	Greek	καίειν (kaíein), καυστός, καυτός (kaustós, kautós), καυστικός (kaustikós), καῦσις (kaûsis), καῦμα (kaûma)	calm, catacaustic, causalgia, causalgic, caustic, cauter, cauterize, cautery, diacaustic, encaustic, holocaust, hypocaust
cav-	hollow	Latin	cavus	cave, cavity, excavation, cavern, cavernous, concave
ced-, cess-	move, yield, go, surrender	Latin	cedere, cessus	accede, cede, concede, precede, procedure, proceed, procession, recede, secede, succeed, success
cel-	hide	Latin	celare "to hide"	ceiling, clandestine, conceal, occult
celer-	quick	Latin	celer, celerare	acceleration, celerity
cen-, caen-	new	Greek	καινός (kainós)	caenogastropod, caenogenesis, Cenozoic
cen-	empty	Greek	κενός (kenós)	cenotaph, kenosis
cen-, coen-	common	Greek	κοινός (koinós)	cenobite, coenesthesia, coenocyte, epicene, epicœne, koinonos, koinophilia
cens-	to assess	Latin	censere	censure, census
cent-	hundred	Latin	centum	cent, centennial, centurion, percent, century
centen-	hundred each	Latin	centeni	centenarian, centenary
centesim-	hundredth	Latin	centesimus	centesimal, centesimation
centr-	center	Greek	κεντεῖν, κέντησις, κέντρον (kéntron) "needle", "spur", κεντρικός, κεντρισμός	acentric, acrocentric, amniocentesis, anthropocentric, anthropocentrism, barycenter, biocentric, biocentrism, centaur, centauromachy, centesis, centre, centric, centrism, centrist, centroid, centromere, centromeric, centrosphere, centrosymmetric, centrosymmetry, centrum, eccentric, eccentrism, eccentrist, ecocentric, ecocentrism, ecocentrist, egocentric, egocentrism, enterocentesis, epicentre, holocentric, metacentric, monocentric, neocentromere, orthocenter, orthocentric, paracentesis, pericardiocentesis, technocentric, technocentrism, telocentric, thoracentesis, thoracocentesis
centri-	center	Latin	centrum	central, center, concentrate, concentric, centrifugal, centripetal
cephal-	head	Greek	κεφαλή (kephalḗ)	acephalic, acephaly, anencephaly, autocephaly, brachiocephalic, brachycephalic, cephalic, cephalomancy, cephalometry, cephalon, cephalopagus, cephalopod, diencephalon, dolichocephalic, encephalitis, encephalogram, encephalopathy, holoprosencephaly, hydrocephalus, macrocephaly, mesaticephalic, mesencephalic, mesocephalic, metencephalon, microcephaly, myelencephalon, neencephalon, paleencephalon, prosencephalon, rhombencephalon, rhombencephalosynapsis, syncephalus, telencephalon
ceram-	clay	Greek	κέραμος (kéramos)	ceramic
cerat-	horn	Greek	κέρας (kéras), κέρατος (kératos)	keratin, Triceratops
cern-, cer-	sift	Latin	cernere "to sift, separate"	ascertain, certain, concern, concert, decree, discern, excrement, secern, secret
cervic-	relating to the neck, relating to the cervix	Latin	cervix, cervicis "neck"	cervix, cervical
ceter-	other	Latin	ceterus	et cetera
chaet-	hair, bristle, or seta	Greek	χαίτη (khaítē) "long hair"	chaetophobia, chaetophorous, Chaetomium, Chaetomorpha, Oligochaeta, Polychaeta, polychaete, spirochaete, spirochete
chir-	of the hand or hands	Greek	χείρ (kheír) "hand"	chiral, chiropractic, Chiroptera, chirurgy, enchiridion, Haplocheirus
chelon-	relating to a turtle	Greek	χελώνη (khelṓnē) "tortoise"	Archelon, chelonia
chlor-	green	Greek	χλωρός (khlōrós)	chloranthy, chlorine, chlorophobia, chlorophyll, chloroplast, pyrochlore
chondr-	cartilage	Greek	χόνδρος (khóndros)	hypochondriasis, osteochondritis
chore-	relating to dance	Greek	χορεία (khoreía) "dancing in unison" from χορός (khorós) "chorus"	chorea, choree, choreia, choreography, chorus, hemichorea
chord-	cord	Latin and Greek	chorda "rope" from χορδή (khordḗ)	Chordata, cord, hexachord, monochord, polychord, tetrachord
chres-	use	Greek	χράω, χρῆσθαι (khrêsthai), χρηστός (khrēstós), χρήστης, χρῆσις (khrêsis), χρήσιμος	chresard, chresonym, chrestomathic, chrestomathy, heterochresonym, heterochresonymy, orthochresonym, orthochresonymy
chro-, chrom-	color	Greek	χρῶμα (khrôma)	achromat, achromatic, achromatism, achromatopsia, achromatopsic, amphichroic, apochromat, auxochrome, chroma, chromatic, chromatid, chromatophore, chrome, chromium, chromogen, chromolithography, chromophobia, chromophore, chromosome, dichroic, dichroism, dichromatic, heliochrome, heterochromatic, heterochromatin, microchromosome, monochromatic, monochrome, photochromism, pleochroism, polychromatic, polychrome, trichroism, trichromatic, trichromic
chron-	time	Greek	χρόνος (khrónos)	anachronism, asynchronous, biochronology, chronaxie, chronic, chronicle, chronogram, chronograph, chronology, chronometer, chronometry, chronophobia, chronophotography, chronostasis, geochronology, heterochrony, hydrochronometer, isochron, protochronism, synchronic, synchronism, synchronize, synchronous, tautochrone
chrys-	gold	Greek	χρυσός (khrusós), χρύσεος "golden"	chrysalis, chryselephantine, chrysolite, chrysophobia, chrysoprase
cili-	eyelash	Latin	cilium	cilia, supercilious
ciner-	ash	Latin	cinis, cineris	incineration
cing-, cinct-	gird	Latin	cingere, cinctus	succinct
circ-	circle, ring	Latin	circulus, circus	circle, circular, circulate, circus
circum-	around	Latin	circum	circumcise, circumference, circumlocution, circumnavigate, circumscribe
cirr-	orange	Greek	κιρρός (kirrhós)	cirrhosis
cirr-	curl, tentacle	Latin	cirrus	cirrus
cis-	on this side of, on the side nearer to the speaker (as opposed to trans-)	Latin	cis	cisalpine, cisandine, cisatlantic, cisgangetic, cisgender, cisjurane, cisleithan, cislunar, cismontane, cispadane, cispontine, cisrhenane
cit-	call, start	Latin	citare, frequentative of ciere	citation, cite, excite, incite, solicit, solicitous
civ-	citizen	Latin	civis	civic, civil, civilian, civility, civilization
clad-	branch	Greek	κλάδος (kládos)	clade, cladistics, cladogenesis, cladogram, heterocladic
clam-	cry out	Latin	clamare	acclaim, claim, clamor, exclamation, proclamation, reclamation
clar-	clear	Latin	clarus, clarare	clarity, clear, declaration
clast-	broken	Greek	κλᾶν, κλαστός (klastós), κλάσις, κλάσμα	anorthoclase, antanaclasis, clastic, iconoclast, orthoclase, osteoclast, plagioclase, pyroclastic, synclastic
claud-, -clud-, claus-, -clus-	close, shut	Latin	claudere, clausus	clause, claustrophobia, conclude, exclude, exclusive, include, occlusion, occult, recluse, seclude
clav-	key	Greek	κλείς (kleís) "key" from κλείειν, (kleíein) "to close"	clavichord, clavicle, conclave
cleist-	closed	Greek	κλείειν, κλειστός (kleistós), κλεῖσμα	cleistogamy, cleistothecium, enterocleisis, kleisma
cleithr-	bar, key	Greek	κλεῖθρον (kleîthron)	Clathrus, cleithrophobia, cleithrum
cle-	call	Greek	ἐκκλησίᾱ, κλῆσις, κλητός (ekklēsíā, klêsis, klētós)	ecclesia, Ecclesiastes, ecclesiastic, ecclesiology, ecclesiophobia, epiclesis, paraclete
clin-	bed	Greek	κλίνη (klínē)	clinic
clin-	lean, recline	Latin	-clinare	decline, declination, incline, inclination, recline
cochl-	snail, spiral shell	Greek	κόχλος (kókhlos)	cochlea
coel-	hollow	Greek	κοῖλος (koîlos)	blastocoel, coelom, coelomate, coelomic, enterocoely, pseudocoelomate, sarcocele, schizocoelomate, schizocoely, spongocoel
col-	strain	Latin	colare, cōlum	colander, coulee, coulis, coulisse, couloir, cullender, cullis, percolate, percolation, percolator, piña colada, portcullis
col-, cult-	cultivate, till, inhabit	Latin	colere, cultus	acculturate, acculturation, agriculture, apiculture, bicultural, colonial, colony, countercultural, counterculture, cult, cultivable, cultivate, cultivation, cultivator, cultural, culturati, culture, deculturate, deculturation, incult, inculturation, inquiline, inquilinity, inquilinous, intercultural, multicultural, postcolonial, precolonial, subcultural, subculture
coll-	hill	Latin	collis	colliculus
coll-	neck	Latin	collum	accolade, col, collar, decollate, decollation, décolletage, encollar
color-	color	Latin	color	bicolor, Colorado, coloration, coloratura, concolorous, decolor, discolor, discoloration, encolor, multicolor, quadricolor, recolor, tricolor, unicolor, versicolor
com-	friendly, kind	Latin	cōmis "courteous, kind"	comity
con-, co-, col-, com-, cor-	with, together	Latin	cum	coagulate, collide, compress, connect, connote, contain, contribute, consult, constitution, corrode, quondam
con-	cone	Greek	κῶνος (kônos), κωνικός (kōnikós)	conic, conical, conicoid, conodont, conoid, conoscope, orthocone, orthoconic, polyconic
condi-	season	Latin	condire	condiment
contra-	against	Latin	contra	contraband, contraception, contradict, contraindicate, contrast, contravene
copi-	plenty	Latin	copia	copious, copy, cornucopia
copr-	dung	Greek	κόπρος (kópros)	copremia, coprographia, coprolagnia, coprolalia, coprolite, coprolith, coprology, coprophagia, coprophagy, coprophilia, copropraxia, encopresis, encopretic
copul-	bond	Latin	copula "that which binds"	copula, copulation, couple
cor-, cord-	heart	Latin	cor, cordis	accord, accordance, accordant, accordatura, concord, concordance, concordant, concordat, corcle, cordate, cordial, cordiality, cordiform, core, courage, courageous, discord, discordance, discordant, discourage, discouragement, encourage, encouragement, misericord, nonaccordant, obcordate, record, scordatura
corac-	raven	Greek	κόραξ, κόρακος (kórax, kórakos)	coracoid
cori-	hide, leather	Latin	corium, corii	coriaceous, corious, corium, cuirass, cuirassier, cuirie, excoriate, excoriation
corn-	horn	Latin	cornū	bicorn, bicorne, Capricorn, cornea, corneal, corneous, corner, cornicle, corniculate, corniferous, cornification, corniform, cornucopia, quadricorn, quadricornous, tricorn, tricorne, tricornigerous, tricornute, unicorn, unicornous
coron-	crown	Latin	corona, coronare	corona, coronation, coronavirus, coroner, coronet, coroniform, Coronilla, crown, incoronate
corpor-	body	Latin	corpus, corporis	accorporate, bicorporal, concorporate, concorporation, corporal, corporality, corporate, corporation, corporative, corporature, corporeal, corporeality, corporeity, corps, corpse, corpulence, corpulent, corpus, corpuscle, corpuscular, disincorporate, disincorporation, extracorporeal, incorporal, incorporality, incorporate, incorporation, incorporeal, incorporeality, incorporeity, tricorporal
cortic-	bark	Latin	cortex, corticis	cortex, cortical, corticate, corticiform, corticifugal, corticipetal, decorticate, decortication, decorticator
cosm-	universe	Greek	κόσμος (kósmos)	cosmic, cosmogeny, cosmogony, cosmology, cosmonaut, cosmopolitan, cosmopolite, cosmos, microcosm
cosmet-	the art of dress and ornament	Greek	κοσμεῖν (kosmeîn), κοσμητική (kosmētikḗ) from κόσμος (kósmos)	cosmesis, cosmetics, cosmetologist, cosmetology
cost-	rib	Latin	costa	accost, bicostate, coast, coastal, costa, costal, costate, curvicostate, entrecôte, infracostal, intercostal, intracoastal, multicostate, quadricostate, supracostal, tricostate, unicostate
cotyl-	cup	Greek	κοτύλη (kotúlē)	cotyledon, dicotyledon, dicotyledonous, eudicotyledon, monocotyledon, monocotyledonous, tricotyledonous
-cracy, -crat	government, rule, authority	Greek	κράτος (krátos), κρατία (kratía)	acrasia, akrasia, akratic, anocracy, aristocracy, autocracy, autocrat, autocratic, bureaucracy, democracy, democratic, pancratium, plutocracy, technocracy, technocrat, theocracy
crani-	skull	Greek	κρανίον (kraníon)	craniologist, craniometry, craniosynostosis, cranium, hemicrania, megrim, migraine
crass-	thick	Latin	crassus	crass, crassitude, crassulaceous
crea-	make	Latin	creare, creatus	creation, creative, creator, creature, creole, procreation, recreation
cred-	believe, trust	Latin	credere, creditus	accreditation, credence, credentials, credibility, credible, credit, creditor, credo, credulity, credulous, creed, discredit, incredible, incredulous, miscreant, recreant
crepid-	boot, shoe	Greek	κρηπίς, κρηπίδος (krēpís, krēpídos), κρηπίδιον, κρηπίδωμα	crepidoma
cresc-	grow, rise	Latin	crescere	accresce, accrescence, accrescent, accrete, accretion, accrue, concrete, crescendo, crescent, crew, decrease, increase, recruit, recruitment, surcrew
cribr-	sieve	Latin	cribrum, cribrare	cribble, cribellate, cribellum, cribrate, cribriform, garble
cric-	ring	Greek	κρίκος (kríkos), κρικοειδής (krikoeidḗs)	cricoid, cricoidectomy, Cricosaurus, cricothyroid, cricothyrotomy, cricotomy
crisp-	curled	Latin	crispus	crape, crepe, crêpe, crisp, crispate, crispation
crist-	crest	Latin	crista	crease, crest, cristate
crit-, crisi-	judge, separate	Greek	κρίνειν (krínein), κρίσις (krísis), κρίμα (kríma)	apocrine, crisis, criterion, critic, critical, criticaster, criticise, criticism, critique, diacritic, eccrine, eccrinology, eccrisis, eccritic, endocrine, endocrinology, exocrine, heterocrine, holocrine, hypercriticism, hypocrisy, hypocrite, kritarchy, Kritosaurus, merocrine, syncrisis
cross-	fringe, tassel	Greek	κροσσός (krossós)	Crossopterygii
cruc-	cross	Latin	crux, crucis	cross, crucial, cruciate, crucifer, cruciferous, crucifix, crucifixion, cruciform, crucify, crucigerous, cruise, crusade, cruzeiro, discruciate, excruciate, intercross, recross
crur-	leg, shank	Latin	crus, cruris	bicrural, crural, crus, equicrural
cry-	cold	Greek	κρύος (krúos)	cryoablation, cryo-adsorption, cryobacterium, cryobiology, cryobot, cryochemistry, cryoelectronics, cryogenics, cryomicroscopy, cryoneurolysis, cryonics, cryopreservation, cryoprotectant, cryosphere, cryosurgery, cryotherapy, cryovolcano
-cry	wail, shriek	Latin	critare, from quiritare	cry, decry, descry
crypt-	hide, hidden	Greek	κρύπτειν (krúptein) "to hide", κρυπτός (kruptós)	apocrypha, apocryphal, archaeocryptography, crypt, cryptanalysis, crypteia, cryptic, cryptobiosis, cryptobiotic, cryptochrome, cryptogam, cryptogenic, cryptography, cryptology, cryptomonad, cryptophyte, cryptosystem, grot, grotesque, grotto
cten-	comb	Greek	κτείς, κτενός (kteís, ktenós)	ctenidium, ctenoid, Ctenophora
cub-	cube	Greek	κύβος (kúbos)	cubic, cuboctahedron, cuboid, hemicube, hypercube
cub-	lie	Latin	cubare	incubation, succuba
culin-	kitchen	Latin	culīna	culinarian, culinary, kiln
culp-	blame, fault	Latin	culpa	culpability, culpable, culprit, exculpate, exculpatory, inculpable, inculpate, inculpatory, mea culpa
cune-	wedge	Latin	cuneus	coign, coigne, coin, cuneate, cuneiform, cuneus, encoignure, obcuneate, precuneus, quoin, sconcheon, scuncheon
cur-	care for	Latin	cūra, curare	accuracy, accurate, assecure, assurance, assure, curability, curable, curacy, curate, curative, curator, cure, curettage, curette, curio, curiosity, curious, ensure, inaccuracy, inaccurate, incurable, insecure, insecurity, insurability, insurable, insurance, insure, manicure, pedicure, pococurante, proctor, proctour, proctorage, proctorial, procurable, procuracy, procuration, procurator, procure, procurement, proxy, reassurance, reassure, reinsurance, reinsure, scour, scourage, secure, security, sinecural, sinecure, sure, surety
curr-, curs-	run, course	Latin	currere, cursus	concur, concurrent, corridor, courier, course, currency, current, cursive, cursor, cursory, discourse, excursion, incur, occur, recur, recursion, recursive, succor
curv-	bent	Latin	curvus "crooked, curved", from curvare "to bend"	cavort, curb, curvaceous, curvate, curvation, curvature, curve, curviform, curvilinear, curvity, incurvate, incurvature, incurve, recurvate, recurve, recurvous
cuspid-	lance, point	Latin	cuspis, cuspidis	bicuspid, bicuspidate, cusp, quadricuspid, tricuspid
cut-	hide, skin	Latin	cutis	cutaneous, cuticle, cuticolor, cuticular, cutin, cutis, cutisector, intracutaneous, subcutaneous
cyan-	blue	Greek	κυανός (kuanós)	anthocyanin, cyanic, cyanide, cyanogen, cyanophobia, cyanophore, cyanosis, cyanotic, isocyanic
cycl-	circle	Greek	κύκλος (kúklos), κυκλικός (kuklikós)	acyclic, anticyclone, anticyclonic, bicycle, cycle, cyclic, cyclide, cycloid, cyclone, cyclops, cyclosis, cyclotomic, dicyclic, eccyclema, epicycle, epicycloid, hemicycle, hemicyclium, heterocyclic, homocyclic, hypercycle, hypocycloid, isocyclic, mesocyclone, monocyclic, polycyclic, pseudocyclosis, tetracyclic, tricycle, tricyclic, unicycle
cylind-	roll	Greek	κυλίνδειν (kulíndein), κύλινδρος (kúlindros)	cylinder, cylindric, cylindroid, cylindroma, pseudocylindric
cyn-	dog	Greek	κύων, κυνός (kúōn, kunós)	cynic, cynicism, cynodont, cynology, cynophagy, cynophilia, cynophobia, Cynosaurus, cynosure, eucynodont
cyst-	capsule	Greek	κύστις (kústis)	cysteine, cystic, cysticercus, cystine, cystolith, cystoma, oocyst, polycystic
cyt-	cell	Greek	κύτος (kútos)	astrocyte, cnidocyte, cytapheresis, cytaster, cytokine, cytokinesis, cytokinin, cytology, cytoplasm, cytostasis, cytostatic, exocytosis, gonocyte, hypercytosis, leukocyte, leukocytosis, monocyte, monocytopoiesis, pancytopenia, phagocytosis, polycythaemia, polycythemia, syncytium
