= Theocentrism =

Belief that God is the central aspect to existence

Theocentrism is the belief that God is the central aspect to existence, as opposed to anthropocentrism, existentialism and sentientism. In this view, meaning and value of actions done to people or the environment are attributed to God. The tenets of theocentrism, such as humility, respect, moderations, selflessness, and mindfulness, can lend themselves towards a form of environmentalism. In modern theology, theocentrism is often linked with stewardship and environmental ethics or Creation care. It is the belief that human beings should look after the world as guardians and therefore in the way God wants them to. Humans should be considerate to all, from animals to plants to humans themselves. It maintains that human beings are merely here for a short time and should be looking after the world for future generations.

In Christian theology, theocentrism has sometimes been used to describe theologies that focus on God the Father, as opposed to those that focus on Christ (Christocentric) or the Holy Spirit (Pneumocentric). Theocentrism was a key element of the Christology of Saint Augustine. This view is resisted among some theologians on the grounds that it poses a challenge to trinity. One of these theologians is Carl Baaten who said, "If one can speak of God who is really God apart from Christ, there is indeed no reason for the doctrine of the Trinity. Some kind of Unitarianism will do the job." Paul F. Knitter, in his defense as a Theocentric Christian, said it depends on how the unity between God and Jesus Christ within trinity is seen. He says that, "we cannot so neatly or exclusively affirm that the Logos/Christ is Jesus. The 'incarnating' activity of the Logos is actualized in but not restricted to Jesus. The God manifested in and as Jesus of Nazareth is the only true God".

Theocentrism can also refer to a theology that does not center on any one person of the Trinity, but rather emphases the entire Godhead as a whole. Theologies that center on the Father are sometimes referred to as paterocentric instead.

It is popular with Christianity, Judaism and Islam.

== See also ==
- Anthropocentrism
- Biocentrism
- Ecocentrism
- Intrinsic value (animal ethics)
- Sentiocentrism
- Speciesism
- Technocentrism
