= OpenAirPhilosophy =

Environmental philosophy project

OpenAirPhilosophy is a project presenting a selection of the work in environmental philosophy of Norwegian philosophers Arne Naess, Sigmund Kvaløy Setreng, and Peter Wessel Zapffe.

The project promotes the inherent worth of living beings regardless of their instrumental utility to human needs, as well as looking at restructuring modern human societies in accordance with such ideas. The project's website holds biographies, selected works and interviews of the three philosophers.

The name of the project comes from a practice in Norway called friluftsliv, which translates as “open-air life.” The term evokes a sense of belonging to the land, making friends with free nature.

Arne Naess, the father of “Deep ecology", was always searching for the existence of what he called “greatness other than human.” Far from moralizing about how other people ought to live, he would invite them to “act beautifully," and to experience how natural it feels to act in ecologically responsible ways. When Naess was asked about his expectations for the future, he would sometimes answer, to the surprise of his interviewers, "I am a pessimist for the 21st century, but an optimist for the 22nd century." This response exemplifies the kind of against-the-grain thinking of the three Norwegian ecophilosophers whose work that is presented at OpenAirPhilosophy: Peter Wessel Zapffe, Sigmund Kvaløy Setreng, and Arne Naess. All demonstrated a surprising ability both to identify and to face directly the vastness of the ecological crisis as it was starting to unfold in their times. Their analysis, however, did not stop at making a dire diagnosis; they also chose to develop and embrace a deeper and more long-term view in which we humans are not automatically assigned centre stage in the pageant of life. Despite writing forthrightly about the grave challenges facing the Earth, each retained a parallel sense of living life to the full, of enjoying the conviviality of being among friends and the fulfilment that comes from working for change - all fueled by experiences in nature. The aim of the project is to engage readers, provoke additional scholarship, and expand the community of activists around the globe who embrace ecocentrism - a worldview in which all life is acknowledged to have intrinsic value.

Content editors for this project are Jan van Boeckel and Ceciel Verheij. Ceciel Verheij translated several Norwegian texts which are published for the first time in English on this website. Andrés Stubelt and Cara Nelson/Swift Trek Media provided web design and development. PDF design and typesetting are by Kevin Cross. Tom Butler of Tompkins Conservation served as overall project director.
