= Christocentrism =

Belief in Jesus Christ as the centre of religious discourse

Christocentrism is a doctrinal term within Christianity, describing theological positions that focus on Jesus Christ, the second person of the Christian Trinity, in relation to the Godhead/God the Father (theocentric) or the Holy Spirit (pneumocentric). Christocentric theologies make Christ the central theme about which all other theological positions/doctrines are oriented.

== Augustinism ==
Certain theological traditions within Christianity can be described as more heavily Christocentric. Notably, the teachings of Augustine of Hippo and Paul of Tarsus, which have been very influential in the West, place a great emphasis on the person of Jesus in the process of salvation.

For instance, in Reformed theology, the Lutheran tradition is seen as more theologically Christocentric, as it places its doctrine of justification by grace, which is primarily a Christological doctrine, at the center of its thought. Meanwhile, the Calvinist tradition is seen as more theologically theocentric, as it places its doctrine of the sovereignty of God ("the Father") at the center.

== John Duns Scotus ==
Duns Scotus is famous for his belief in the primacy of Jesus, whereby the Logos would have become incarnate even had the Fall never taken place. Scotus writes, "that God predestined this soul [of Christ] to so great a glory does not seem to be only on account of [redemption], since the redemption or the glory of the soul to be redeemed is not comparable to the glory of Christ’s soul. Neither is it likely that the highest good in creation is something that was merely occasioned only because of some lesser good; nor is it likely that He predestined Adam to such good before He predestined Christ; and yet this would follow [were the Incarnation occasioned by Adam’s sin]. In fact, if the predestination of Christ’s soul was for the sole purpose of redeeming others, something even more absurd would follow, namely, that in predestining Adam to glory, He would have foreseen him as having fallen into sin before He predestined Christ to glory". As such, Scotus's theology is grounded in the claim that Creation exists for the sake of Jesus, regardless of whether any individual chooses to sin.

== John Paul II ==
John Paul II's magisterium has been called Christocentric by Catholic theologians. He further taught that the Marian devotions of the Rosary were in fact Christocentric because they brought the faithful to Jesus through Mary.

== Biblical hermeneutics ==
The Christocentric principle is also commonly used for biblical hermeneutics. The aim behind it is to read and interpret the narratives of the Old Testament in light and primacy of the revelation of Jesus. It is usually employed to demonstrate the Christ typologically (or via allegoresis) through the Hebrew Bible (since Christ did not fulfill any prophecy in the authorial context), but not in a grammatical or authorial sense as understood today. Another aim behind it is to purge away detrimental and/or theologically incoherent ideas of God found in the texts of the Old Testament. The Christocentric method (as in Christ is the interpretive telos or goal behind reading the Law) is mentioned by the apostle Paul in Romans 10:4, and Ignatius of Antioch thematically demonstrates that the Christ (or the revelation of Christ) is the magisterial and “inviolable” record, or the “charters” according to J. B. Lightfoot and Kirsopp Lake; Ignatius considers the incarnation of the Christ to be superior to the Jewish writings when he disagrees with the religious Jews on what is considered authoritative (Philadelphians 8:2-9:2). Ignatius repeats this idea by writing, “But the Gospel has its own preeminence: the advent of the Savior, our Lord Jesus Christ, His passion, and the resurrection,” or “ ἐξαίρετον δέ τι ἔχει τὸ εὐαγγέλιον, τὴν παρουσίαν τοῦ σωτῆρος, κυρίου ἡμῶν Ἰησοῦ Χριστοῦ, τὸ πάθος αὐτοῦ, καὶ τὴν ἀνάστασιν”. The Greek is found in Kirsopp’s edition.

This interpretive technique is employed by early Christians like Paul of Tarsus when he argues (through a rhetorical, dichotomous question) that the Mosaic command for the care of oxen was not inspired by God in its original context, but in its spiritual form for believers (1st Corin. 9:9-10), when he argues that the Mosaic rites acted as symbols or types for Jesus (Colo. 2:16-17), like the patristic Pseudo-Barnabas, who argued that God never forbade the consumption of pork, nor commanded circumcision since these things were interpreted naively due to an evil angel misleading them, but these served as spiritual lessons (ibid. 9:1, 4, 6, 10:2-3, 9), like Origen of Alexandria when he argued that infantile Christians had vicious and irrational ideas of God (an interpretive mistake similarly employed by the Gnostics and Jews) due to literalism and a lack of the pneumatic, interpretive approach (First Prin. IV.8-9), like Saint Athanasius, who cited Colossians 2:17 and Hebrews 9:10, argued that God never commanded sacrifice through the law of Moses, “nor even when they came to mount Sinai,” but He prefigured the symbols towards Christ (Letter 19, Section 3–4), like Gregory of Nyssa when he wrote that the Exodus narrative where the firstborn die for the sins of their fathers is an idea so impious that he considers it unworthy of God; thus, he reinterprets it as “The teaching is this: When through virtue one comes to grips with any evil, he must completely destroy the first beginnings of evil” (Life of Moses 2.89-101), and even an early Christian document, the Didascalia, speaks of Christ fulfilling the types and it denies God commanding sacrifice in the beginning to Cain and Abel (ibid. Chapter 26, translated by R. Hugh Connolly).

== Interfaith and ecumenism ==
Christocentrism is also a name given to a particular approach in interfaith and ecumenical dialogue. It teaches that Christianity is absolutely true, but the elements of truth in other religions are always in relation to the fullness of truth found in Christianity. The Holy Spirit is thought to allow inter-religious dialogue and to influence non-believers in their journey to Christ. This view is notably advocated by the Catholic Church in the declarations Nostra aetate, Unitatis Redintegratio and Dominus Iesus.

== See also ==
- Solus Christus
- Christology
- Christomonism
