= Evolutional Ethics and Animal Psychology =

1897 book by Edward Payson Evans

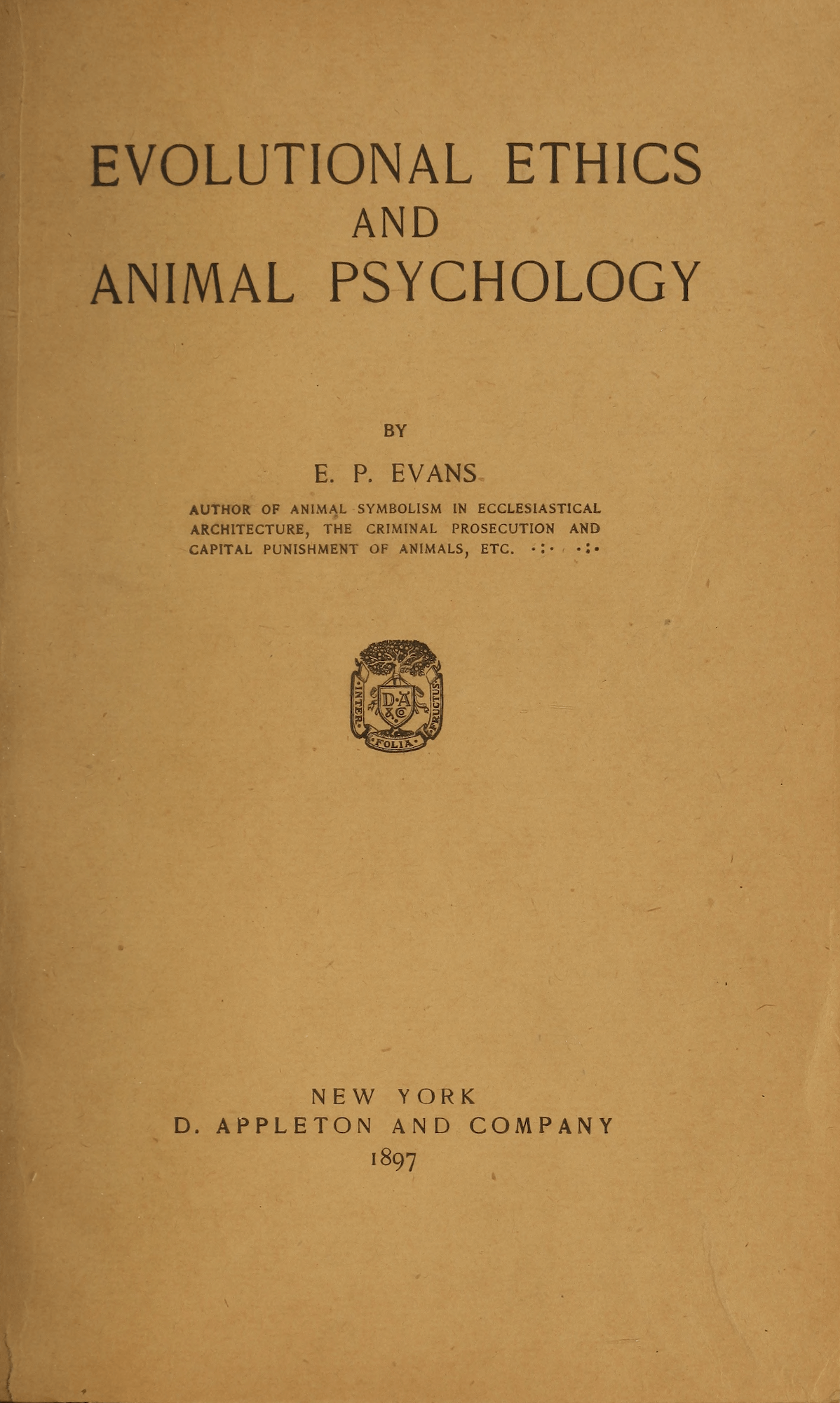
- First edition title page
- Author: Edward Payson Evans
- Language: English
- Subject: Animal rights; animal psychology; evolutionary ethics; human–animal relationships; moral philosophy; history of ethics
- Genre: Philosophy; psychology; animal studies
- Publisher: D. Appleton & Company
- Publication date: 1897
- Publication place: United States
- Media type: Print (hardcover)
- Pages: 386
- OCLC: 4854608
- Text: Evolutional Ethics and Animal Psychology at Internet Archive

Evolutional Ethics and Animal Psychology is an 1897 book by American scholar Edward Payson Evans, published by D. Appleton & Company. The book examines the ethical implications of evolutionary theory for the treatment of nonhuman animals. Evans argues that evolutionary continuity undermines traditional anthropocentrism in moral philosophy and supports extending moral concern to animals.

The book discusses animal psychology, the history of ethics, and human–animal relationships. Evans argues that animals' mental and emotional capacities should be recognized in ethics and law. It was among the early English-language works to connect evolutionary ethics with animal rights, and was later cited by writers including Henry Stephens Salt. Reviews at the time were mixed.

== Background ==
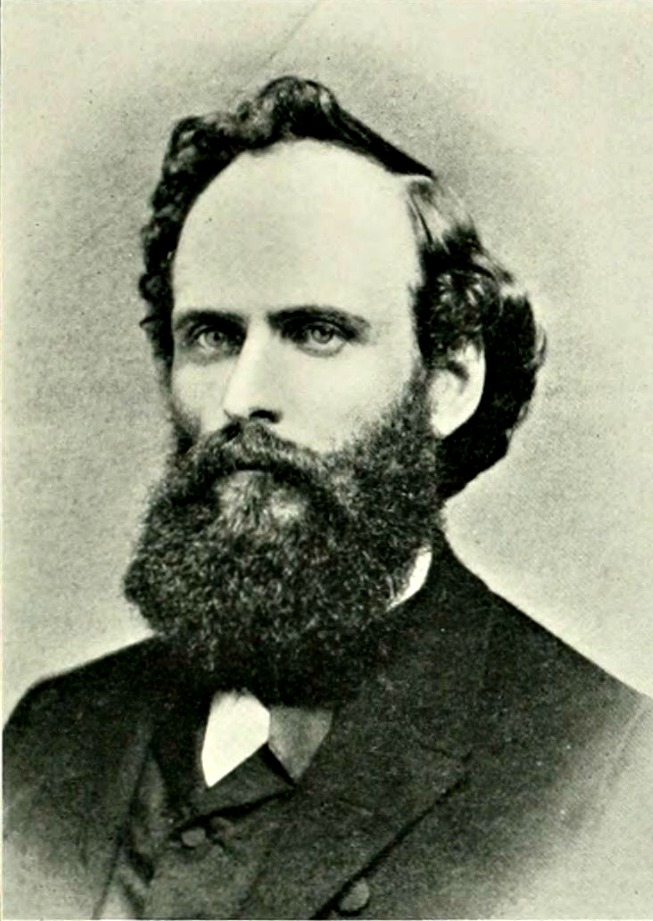
Edward Payson Evans, 1906

Edward Payson Evans (1831–1917) was an American scholar with interests in literature, languages, and moral philosophy. He taught modern languages at the University of Michigan and later lived in Europe, where he contributed to the Allgemeine Zeitung of Munich. His published works covered German literature, linguistics, religious symbolism, and ethics.

Evolutional Ethics and Animal Psychology followed Evans's 1894 article "Ethical Relations Between Man and Beast", in which he criticized anthropocentric moral views and argued for broader ethical consideration of animals. In that article, Evans discussed religious and philosophical doctrines that excluded animals from moral concern, and called for a reassessment based on scientific understandings of animal psychology.

== Summary ==
The ethical corollaries to Darwin's doctrine of the origin of species and to his theory of development through descent under the modifying influences of environment and natural selection have already passed these bounds of beneficence not only by demanding the mitigation of cruelty to slaves, but also by the abolition of slavery, and not only by inculcating the kind treatment of animals by individuals, but also by asserting the principle of animals' rights and the necessity of vindicating them by imposing judicial punishments for their violation.

— Edward Payson Evans, Evolutional Ethics and Animal Psychology, p. 14

Evolutional Ethics and Animal Psychology argues that ethics concerning animals should be informed by animal psychology. Evans begins by tracing the development of ethical ideas from early human societies. He writes that in tribal societies, moral rights and obligations were usually confined to blood relations within the same tribe, while outsiders, including both humans and animals, were often treated as enemies or as beings without rights.

Evans argues that ethical concern expanded as human societies developed, first beyond the tribe and eventually, in his view, beyond humanity. He criticizes anthropocentric moral systems that place humans above all other life and argues that such views are scientifically outdated. For Evans, animals' capacities to feel pain, form attachments, act consciously, and learn from experience are relevant to how they should be treated.

The book also surveys religious, cultural, and philosophical traditions that shaped attitudes toward animals. Evans discusses societies and doctrines that encouraged compassion toward animals, as well as those that justified animal use on the grounds that animals lacked souls, reason, or higher intelligence.

Evans maintains that many historical attitudes toward animals were shaped more by human ignorance and self-interest than by ethical reflection. He argues that animals should not be treated merely as resources or tools for human use, but as beings with interests of their own. On this basis, he supports legal protections for animals and criticizes cruelty, vivisection, hunting, and other practices that he regarded as inconsistent with evolutionary ethics.

== Reception ==
David Irons, writing in The Philosophical Review, described the book as "an interesting, if rather popular and discursive, treatment of one of the applications of the theory of evolution." A review in the Journal of Education called it "an interesting and important contribution to the fascinating discussion of the relation of animal species and human races to each other."

Carl Evans Boyd, reviewing the book in The American Journal of Theology, criticized Evans's reliance on stories about animal intelligence, which he considered an insufficient basis for generalization. Boyd also criticized Evans for a "failure to recognize that if expatriation be a natural right, it is a right only as against the state of origin, and can have no reference to any other state." Edmond Kelly criticized Evans's use of disputed Lamarckian theory in the book.

== Legacy ==
In the 1922 revised edition of Animals' Rights: Considered in Relation to Social Progress, Henry Stephens Salt cited Evans's book as an example of recent writing that challenged the traditional distinction between human and non-human animal intelligence. Salt also drew attention to Evans's argument that humans should move beyond anthropocentric views that treat humans as fundamentally separate from other sentient beings and therefore as owing them no moral obligations.

Writing in 1989, R. J. Hoage described the book as, in the 90 years since its publication, unequalled in its scholarship and insight on evolutionary ethics and the ethical treatment of animals.

== See also ==
- Moral circle expansion
- The Universal Kinship, a later book by J. Howard Moore which makes similar arguments for the ethical treatment of animals
- The Expanding Circle
