= Animal trial =

Criminal proceedings against animals

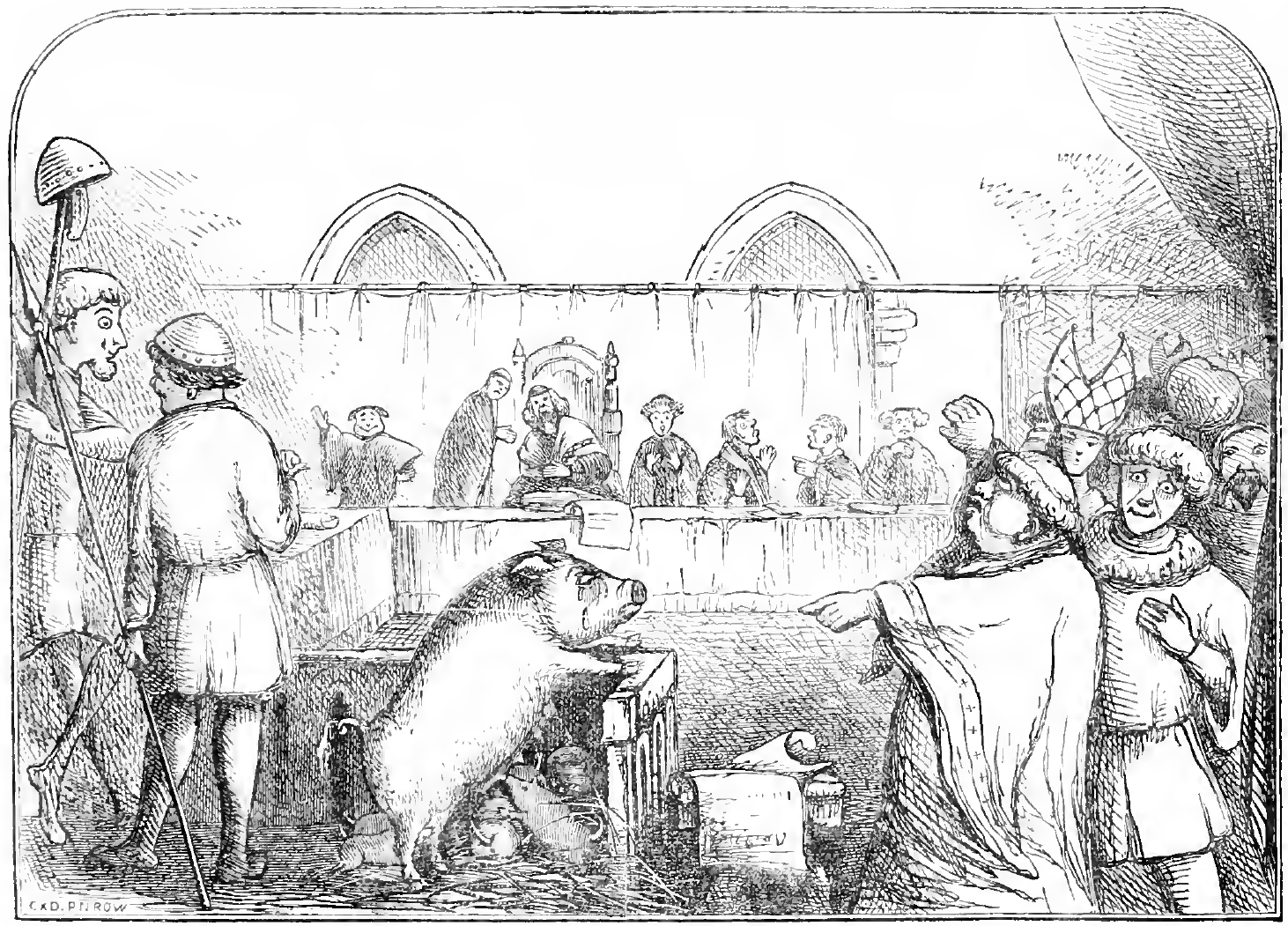
Illustration from Chambers Book of Days depicting a sow and her piglets being tried for the murder of a child. The trial allegedly took place in 1457, the mother being found guilty and the piglets acquitted.

In legal history, an animal trial is a trial of a non-human animal. These trials were conducted in both secular and ecclesiastic courts. Records of such trials show that they took place in Europe from the thirteenth to the eighteenth century. The legal archives on animal cases are spotty. France has preserved significant documentation, but, more generally, extant records do not permit a comprehensive analysis of the prevalence and distribution of these cases at different points in time and place.

In the modern era, non-human animals cannot be held culpable for an act in most criminal justice systems on the grounds that they lack moral agency.

== History of animal trials ==
Trial documents, legal treatises and witness accounts shed light on the history of animal trials in Europe. The somewhat patchy nature of this documentation does not allow legal analysts to draw comprehensive conclusions about the legal and cultural importance of these trials. For example, one analyst evokes the "possibility that the efflorescence of these trials in late mediaeval France is entirely an artifact of the record...". In other words, we know only of the cases whose documents have survived until modern times (and this collection of extant records includes many French cases), not those cases whose proceedings were never recorded or were lost. Furthermore, some compendia of cases only include those in which the animal was found guilty. Despite these weaknesses in the historical record, it is clear that such trials did take place, given the hundreds of cases for which documentation exists.

In the thirteenth to the twentieth century, "animal trials were held in many European regions, especially in France, but also in Switzerland, Tyrol, Germany, the Netherlands, the southern Slavonic countries and, on rare occasions, in Italy and Spain." In France, the first written judgments are said to date to the thirteenth century. Although there is some controversy about the date of the first recorded jurisprudence. Some authors fix the date at 1226, the year in which a pig was burned alive in Fontenay-aux-Roses for having devoured an infant.

These trials were part of a broader set of judicial practices that seem archaic to modern eyes, such as the prosecution of corpses and of inanimate objects. Animals were charged for causing various types of harm to either individual humans (e.g. pigs killing young children) or to entire communities (e.g. pests causing crop damage). Being a partner in bestiality was another possible charge.

Numerous species of animals could face criminal or ecclesiastic charges across many parts of Europe. The animal species involved were almost invariably either domesticated ones (most often pigs, bulls, horses, donkeys, mules and cows, for secular courts) or pests such as rats and weevils for ecclesiastical courts. In contrast, "wild beasts, like wolves or bears, were never subject to such legal action… ."

== Proceedings and punishments ==
The proceedings of animal trials were generally similar to those of humans. Animal defendants appeared before both church and secular courts, and the charges brought against them ranged from murder to criminal damage. Human witnesses were often heard, and in ecclesiastical courts the animals were provided with lawyers (this was not always the case in secular courts, but in some places and time periods, human defendants did not have defense lawyers either). If convicted, it was usual for an animal to be executed or exiled.

=== Secular proceedings and punishments ===
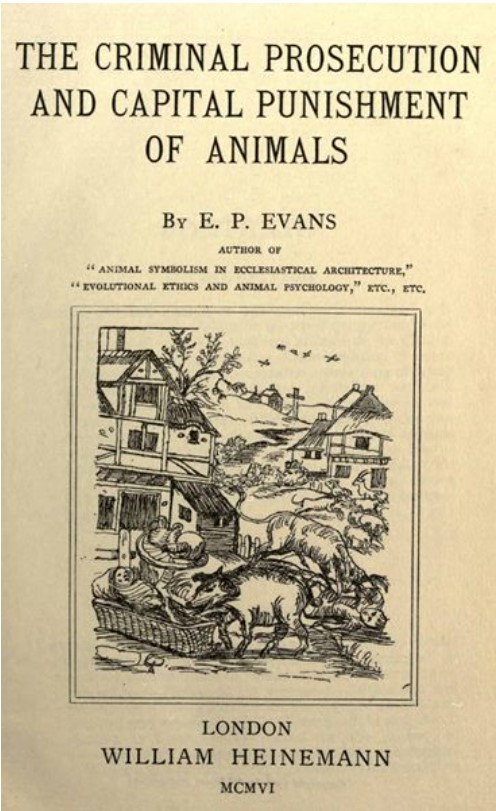
Cover of The Criminal Prosecution and Capital Punishment of Animals by Edward Payson Evans

In the Middle Ages, criminal proceedings for animals largely followed those for humans. These were formal proceedings carried out by professional lawyers and experts and following established procedural law. When an animal was accused of committing a crime against a human or against his property, the animal was notified and might have been assigned a defense lawyer (however, during certain time periods and in certain locations, even humans may not have had legal representation at trial).

In at least some cases, the owner of the animal that was criminally charged could be a co-defendant or complicit in the crime. For example, according to the Saint Louis Establishments (a Medieval collection of legal documents), the owner of a domestic animal found to be responsible for the murder could be hanged if he admitted to having prior knowledge of the animal's vice. If he swore that he was unaware of the animal's vice, he owed to the courts the relief of a dead man (a fine paid for the death of a person) and, in all cases, the animal was confiscated by the court.

If found guilty of homicide, the animal could be sentenced to death. The carrying out of sentences was solemn and public and was usually performed by professional executioners. Frequently, large crowds gathered to witness the execution. Sometimes the animal was dressed in human attire prior to being killed. A variety of methods were used to put convicted animals to death, including hanging, strangling and burning. Sometimes, instead of burning animals while they were still alive, the judge showed mercy and permitted the animal to be singed, strangled and then burnt. The animal might also be tortured before being executed; for example, a pig that killed a child in the Norman city of Failaise in 1386 and, in so doing, mutilated its face and arms, was subjected to the same mutilations prior to being hung. This scene was later memorialised in a fresco painted in the local church.

=== Trials of pests ===
Although less frequent than those just described, other animal trials sought to condemn pests for destroying crops or causing other harm to humans. These cases, generally handled by ecclesiastical courts, examined the misdeeds of a wide range of pests, including caterpillars, flies, moles, worms, snails, and leeches. The objective of these trials was to find the pests guilty and to cause them to leave. In doing so, ecclesiastical courts necessarily resorted to different judicial techniques to render decisions on the pests. They requested the intervention of the church to begin with the pertinent metaphysical actions, such as exorcisms, incantations and the sprinkling of holy water.

Evans discusses the use of several techniques used for the expulsion and extermination of pests. He cites a treatise by Kassianos Bassos, a Byzantine Bithynian who lived in the tenth century. Bassos had devised a recipe to banish field mice, as follows:

Take a slip of paper and write on it these words: I adjure you, O mice, who dwell here not to injure me yourselves nor to permit any other mouse to do so; and I make over to you this field. But should I find you staying here after having been warned, with the help of the mother of the gods I will cut you in seven pieces.

Evans also mentions how in the 17th century the people of the Lucerne, knowing the pope had the ability to condemn and curse pests without having to undergo legal technicalities, paid a pope to conjure up a hexing document.

== Specific cases ==
=== France – homicidal pigs ===
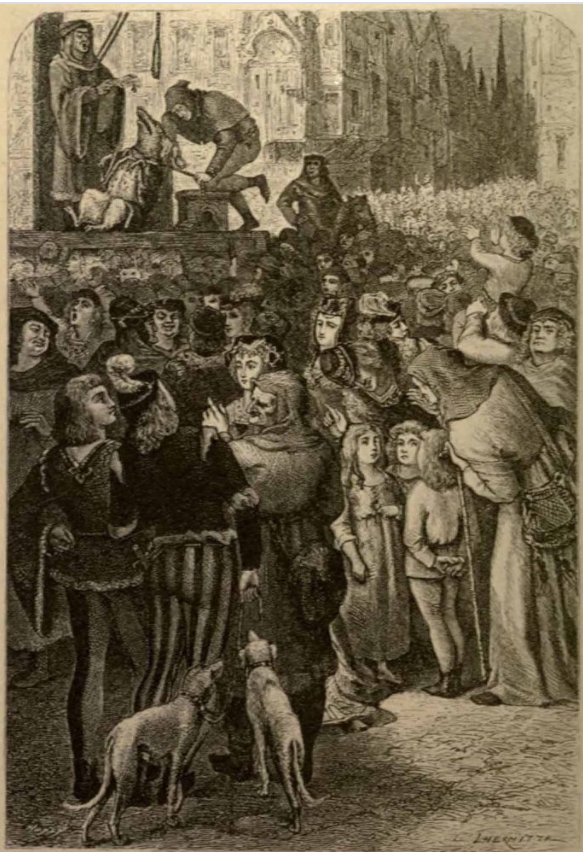
Execution of a pig from the 1906 book, The Criminal Prosecution and Punishment of Animals

Pigs were often the target of criminal cases because they lived amongst humans and could be dangerous, especially for young children. An inventory of such cases between from the thirteenth to the sixteenth century finds 15 cases where pigs were executed for killing children. Generally, the condemned pigs were hung and sometimes tortured prior to execution. For example, in 1492, a piglet was dragged and then hung by the hind legs for murdering a child in Abbeville.

In some cases, not only was the direct author of the crime found guilty, but "accomplices" might be identified. For example, in the village of Saint-Marcel-le-Jeussey in 1379, two herds of pigs were said to have rioted and incited an infanticide committed by other pigs. Although the pigs found guilty of homicide were sentenced to death, the two herds of complicit pigs were pardoned, thanks to the intervention of the Duke of Burgundy.

=== France – rats and woodworms ===
A notable French jurist, Bartholomé Chassenée (1480-1542), successfully defended the rats of Autun through various largely procedural arguments. He won an extension for the rats (who had failed to honour a summons and appear in ecclesiastical court) by arguing that they did so because they feared for their lives. He used similar arguments in defense of woodworms in Mamirolle.

=== Switzerland – unnatural roosters ===
According to Johannis Gross in Kurze Basler Chronik (1624), a rooster was put on trial in 1474 in the city of Basel for "the heinous and unnatural crime of laying an egg", which the townspeople feared was spawned by Satan and contained a cockatrice, a malignant, winged reptile. The rooster was burnt, along with its egg, in front of a large crowd in a place called Kohlenberger. Another such case took place elsewhere in Switzerland in 1730. Modern science has discovered that the facts underpinning these cases can occur when chickens develop male plumage as a result of tumours or other diseases of the ovaries.

== Rationale and criticism ==
A number of explanations have been advanced as to why these practices, so strange to modern eyes, were adopted. One of these is that they served as a source of deterrence. According to one analyst, the "principal aim of justice is example ... If we see ... a pig hanged and strangled for having eaten a child (a punishment which is familiar to us), it is to induce fathers & mothers, nursemaids, servants not to leave their children all alone, or to lock up their animals well so that they cannot injure or harm (the children)." ^{Quoted in} Another possibility is that such spectacles served as a form of public entertainment in an era where opportunities for such entertainment may have been limited. Finally, given that the secular law of the time gained its legitimacy from and was closely linked to religious belief, the elaborate spectacles of animal executions could also have served as communal mechanisms for restoring faith in the broader divine and public order; that is, the spectacle provided a means for the public to see that both divine and secular "justice is done".

While animal trials and executions presumably made sense to many Medieval and early modern communities, the idea nevertheless attracted criticism of scholars and legal practitioners over many centuries. A compendium of Roman law, the Digest, notes that animals are "senseless" and therefore cannot commit "infringements". In a similar vein, Thomas Aquinas asserts in Summa Theologiae that animals are not subjects of law because they cannot understand words or think rationally. Philippe de Rémi, a French jurist and royal official who died in 1296, states in 1283 that criminal acts require intent and that, therefore, animals cannot commit them and should not be punished for them because they lack knowledge of good and evil. Thus, for centuries, some legal analysts expressed misgivings about the metaphysical basis of these trials.

== In popular culture and law ==
- In Lewis Carroll's humorous 1876 poem The Hunting of the Snark, the Barrister dreams about the trial of a pig accused of deserting its sty. In the musical adaptation this features as the song The Pig Must Die.
- Julian Barnes describes a trial against a woodworm in his 1989 book A History of the World in 10½ Chapters.
- The 1957 episode of The Adventures of Robin Hood, "The Christmas Goose", featured a lord of the manor putting a boy's pet goose Matilda on trial for attacking him to defend the boy, and sentenced her to be his Christmas dinner. However, Robin Hood convinces him not to kill the bird.
- The 1993 film The Hour of the Pig, released as The Advocate in the United States, centers on the prosecution of a homicidal pig. Several episodes reflect historical events, and its scriptwriters evidently consulted actual trial transcripts, though the plot revolves around a historical conceit – Colin Firth plays the pig's defence lawyer.
- In Olga Tokarczuk's 2009 novel Drive Your Plow Over the Bones of the Dead, the main protagonist writes to police using historical examples of animal trials to justify her theory that animals are responsible for recent local murders.
- The 2013 visual novel adventure video game Phoenix Wright: Ace Attorney – Dual Destinies offers an additional court case as downloadable content, where the protagonist Phoenix Wright defends an orca accused of murder
- Evans' work on animal trials and executions has been cited by the Constitutional Court of Colombia in the context of deliberations on animals' status as subjects of law.

== See also ==
- Animal rights
- Cadaver Synod
- Damnatio ad bestias
- Elephant executions
- Topsy (elephant)
- Mary (elephant)
- Tyke (elephant)
- The Case of the Animals versus Man
