= The Expanding Circle =

1981 book by Peter Singer

The Expanding Circle: Ethics and Sociobiology
- Author: Peter Singer
- Language: English
- Publisher: Clarendon Press; Farrar, Straus and Giroux
- Publication date: 1981
- Publication place: United Kingdom; United States
- Pages: xiii + 190

The Expanding Circle: Ethics and Sociobiology is a 1981 book by Peter Singer bridging the topics of sociobiology and ethics.

== Arguments ==
The central tenet of the book is that over the course of human history, people have expanded the circle of beings whose interests they are willing to value similarly to their own. Originally that circle would have been self, family and tribe, but over time it grew to encompass all other humans. In the book, Singer argues that the circle should be expanded to include most animals:

The circle of altruism has broadened from the family and tribe to the nation and race, and we are beginning to recognize that our obligations extend to all human beings. The process should not stop there. In my earlier book, Animal Liberation, I showed that it is as arbitrary to restrict the principle of equal consideration of interests to our own species as it would be to restrict it to our own race. The only justifiable stopping place for the expansion of altruism is the point at which all whose welfare can be affected by our actions are included within the circle of altruism. This means that all beings with the capacity to feel pleasure or pain should be included; we can improve their welfare by increasing their pleasures and diminishing their pains. The expansion of the moral circle should therefore be pushed out until it includes most animals.

The Expanding Circle's longest chapter concerns the relationship between reason and ethics. Singer discusses the relationship between biological capacity for altruism and morality. He argues that altruism, when directed to one's small circle of family, tribe or even nation, is not moral, but it becomes so when applied to wider circles. This happens because of human capacity for reason, which "generalizes or universalizes" our altruistic tendencies beyond groups we are biologically inclined to be altruistic to. As such, reason is not the opposite of emotions and instincts but instead builds on it. Hence the book title, the "expanding circle", with the circle being our consideration of whom we can be altruistic to, and the reason for its expansion, reason – a product of both ethics and sociology.

== Reception ==
One reviewer noted that the book is "a remarkable and worthwhile synthesis of the neo-Kantian ethics of the Harvard moral philosopher John Rawls and the sociobiology of Harvard's E. O. Wilson". Singer's book was indeed seen as one of the responses to Wilson’s 1975 work, Sociobiology: The New Synthesis, which argued that understanding ethics can be reduced to understanding our sociobiological programming. While Wilson's work was at first ignored by moral philosophers, generally seen as controversial and even described as "arrogant", Singer was one of the first moral philosophers to constructively engage with it, arguing that at least some of sociobiology's arguments in general and Wilson's arguments in particular are valuable for further development of our understanding of the field of ethics (also known as moral philosophy).

== Editions ==
A new edition, published in 2011, includes a new afterword by Singer. In it, the author discusses how recent progress in biology and genetics have influenced his thinking, and how it reinforces his original theory.

== See also ==
- Evolutional Ethics and Animal Psychology
- The Universal Kinship
