= Holocentric =

Philosophical position

Holocentric is a philosophical position that focuses on solutions as the outcome of human agency and on critical thinking. It is one of the four fundamental worldview types proposed by Richard Bawden in 1997, the other three being technocentric, ecocentric, and egocentric.

Drawing on ideas introduced by Burrell and Morgan and Miller, Bawden developed the notion of a worldview matrix in which the four viewpoints represent the basic philosophical positions of members in a community of interest considering an ontological dimension (with holism and reductionism along the x axis) and an epistemological dimension (with objectivism and relativism-contextualism along the y axis).

The so-called Miller–Bawden quadrants can be utilized as a framework to assist in the collaborative dialog of any cooperative endeavor and the positioning of the holocentric quadrant at the intersection of holism and relativism distinguishes it uniquely as a view which accommodates both the complex and often non-specific interactions that lie at the heart of any social group.

In a community's response to threats and opportunities, the formulation of strategy will typically evolve through a dialog between stakeholder members holding different viewpoints. In a holocentric approach, the resulting strategy will include holistic characteristics in that the solution will reflect the constituent positions within the community with the addition of the creative tension that is contributed through the negotiation process. Through the dialog process, emergent properties arise in the strategy due to the interplay between the various stakeholder viewpoints.

In order to improve the effectiveness of a community's responses, consideration must be given to techniques which can deal with complex systems and the advancement of critical thinking skills. Such techniques often employ aspects of systems thinking to help community members better appreciate and deal with the complex interdependencies and conflicts that arise between stakeholder views.

As the community becomes more effective in the process of dialog, it may become more self-aware, and this ‘systemic’ heightening of awareness may lead to additional emergent properties which in turn may further increase the overall level of understanding and quality of the community response.

Within a cooperative community, the catalysts for the emergent understanding are the insights gained through inspirational learning and the abstract concepts learned through experiential learning.

Educational approaches aimed at managing the critical learning process through the application of the Miller / Bawden Quadrants have been used in a number of different domains, most commonly those in which a wide variety of stakeholders are forced to formulate strategies dealing with limited natural resources. In this environment, agreement amongst sufficiently powerful stakeholders in any community will inevitably involve negotiated trade-offs, for example between productivity, equity, sustainability and stability.
