= Anthropocentrism =

Worldview that humans are the most important beings

Anthropocentrism (from Ancient Greek ἄνθρωπος (ánthrōpos) 'human' and κέντρον (kéntron) 'center') is the belief that human beings are the central or most important entity on the planet. The term can be used interchangeably with humanocentrism, and some refer to the concept as human supremacy or human exceptionalism. From an anthropocentric perspective, humankind is seen as separate from nature and superior to it, and other entities (animals, plants, minerals, etc.) are viewed as resources for humans to use.

It is possible to distinguish between at least three types of anthropocentrism: perceptual anthropocentrism (which "characterizes paradigms informed by sense-data from human sensory organs"); descriptive anthropocentrism (which "characterizes paradigms that begin from, center upon, or are ordered around Homo sapiens / 'the human'"); and normative anthropocentrism (which "characterizes paradigms that make assumptions or assertions about the superiority of Homo sapiens, its capacities, the primacy of its values, [or] its position in the universe").

Anthropocentrism tends to interpret the world in terms of human values and experiences. It is considered to be profoundly embedded in many modern human cultures and conscious acts. It is a major concept in the field of environmental ethics and environmental philosophy, where it is often considered to be the root cause of problems created by human action within the ecosphere. However, many proponents of anthropocentrism state that this is not necessarily the case: they argue that a sound long-term view acknowledges that the global environment must be made continually suitable for humans and that the real issue is shallow anthropocentrism.

== Environmental philosophy ==
Some environmental philosophers have argued that anthropocentrism is a core part of a perceived human drive to dominate or "master" the Earth. Anthropocentrism is believed by some to be the central problematic concept in environmental philosophy, where it is used to draw attention to claims of a systematic bias in traditional Western attitudes to the non-human world that shapes humans' sense of self and identities. Val Plumwood argued that anthropocentrism plays an analogous role in green theory to androcentrism in feminist theory and ethnocentrism in anti-racist theory. Plumwood called human-centredness "anthrocentrism" to emphasise this parallel.

One of the first extended philosophical essays addressing environmental ethics, John Passmore's Man's Responsibility for Nature, has been criticised by defenders of deep ecology because of its anthropocentrism, often claimed to be constitutive of traditional Western moral thought. Indeed, defenders of anthropocentrism concerned with the ecological crisis contend that the maintenance of a healthy, sustainable environment is necessary for human well-being as opposed to for its own sake. According to William Grey, the problem with a "shallow" viewpoint is not that it is human-centred: "What's wrong with shallow views is not their concern about the well-being of humans, but that they do not really consider enough in what that well-being consists. According to this view, we need to develop an enriched, fortified anthropocentric notion of human interest to replace the dominant short-term, sectional and self-regarding conception." In turn, Plumwood in Environmental Culture: The Ecological Crisis of Reason argued that Grey's anthropocentrism is inadequate.

Many devoted environmentalists encompass a somewhat anthropocentric-based philosophical view supporting the fact that they will argue in favor of saving the environment for the sake of human populations. Grey writes: "We should be concerned to promote a rich, diverse, and vibrant biosphere. Human flourishing may certainly be included as a legitimate part of such a flourishing." Such a concern for human flourishing amidst the flourishing of life as a whole, however, is said to be indistinguishable from that of deep ecology and biocentrism, which has been proposed as both an antithesis of anthropocentrism and as a generalised form of anthropocentrism.

== Cognitive psychology ==
In cognitive psychology, the term anthropocentric thinking has been defined as "the tendency to reason about unfamiliar biological species or processes by analogy to humans." Reasoning by analogy is an attractive thinking strategy, and it can be tempting to apply one's own experience of being human to other biological systems. For example, because death is commonly felt to be undesirable, it may be tempting to form the misconception that death at a cellular level or elsewhere in nature is similarly undesirable (whereas in reality programmed cell death is an essential physiological phenomenon, and ecosystems also rely on death). Conversely, anthropocentric thinking can also lead people to underattribute human characteristics to other organisms. For instance, it may be tempting to wrongly assume that an animal that is very different from humans, such as an insect, will not share particular biological characteristics, such as reproduction or blood circulation.

Anthropocentric thinking has predominantly been studied in young children (mostly up to the age of 10) by developmental psychologists interested in its relevance to biology education. Children as young as 6 have been found to attribute human characteristics to species unfamiliar to them (in Japan), such as rabbits, grasshoppers or tulips. Although relatively little is known about its persistence at a later age, evidence exists that this pattern of human exceptionalist thinking can continue through young adulthood at least, even among students who have been increasingly educated in biology.

The notion that anthropocentric thinking is an innate human characteristic has been challenged by study of American children raised in urban environments, among whom it appears to emerge between the ages of 3 and 5 years as an acquired perspective. Children's recourse to anthropocentric thinking seems to vary with their experience of nature, and cultural assumptions about the place of humans in the natural world. For example, whereas young children who kept goldfish were found to think of frogs as being more goldfish-like, other children tended to think of frogs in terms of humans. More generally, children raised in rural environments appear to use anthropocentric thinking less than their urban counterparts because of their greater familiarity with different species of animals and plants. Studies involving children from some of the indigenous peoples of the Americas have found little use of anthropocentric thinking. Study of children among the Wichí people in South America showed a tendency to think of living organisms in terms of their perceived taxonomic similarities, ecological considerations, and animistic traditions, resulting in a much less anthropocentric view of the natural world than is experienced by many children in Western societies.

== Abrahamic traditions ==
In the 1985 CBC series "A Planet For the Taking", David Suzuki explored the Old Testament roots of anthropocentrism and how it shaped human views of non-human animals. Some Christian proponents of anthropocentrism base their belief on the Bible, such as the verse 1:26 in the Book of Genesis:

And God said, Let us make man in our image, after our likeness: and let them have dominion over the fish of the sea, and over the fowl of the air, and over the cattle, and over all the earth, and over every creeping thing that creepeth upon the earth.

The use of the word "dominion" in the Genesis has been used to justify an anthropocentric worldview, but recently some have found it controversial, viewing it as possibly a mistranslation from the Hebrew. However an argument can be made that the Bible actually places all the importance on God as creator, and humans as merely another part of creation.

=== Jewish opposition to anthropocentrism ===
Moses Maimonides, a Torah scholar who lived in the twelfth century AD, was renowned for his staunch opposition to anthropocentrism. He referred to humans as "just a drop in the bucket" and asserted that "humans are not the axis of the world". He also claimed that anthropocentric thinking is what leads humans to believe in the existence of evil things in nature. According to Rabbi Norman Lamm, Moses Maimonides "refuted the exaggerated ideas about the importance of man and urged us to abandon these fantasies.

=== Catholicism ===
Catholic social teaching sees the pre-eminence of human beings over the rest of creation in terms of service rather than domination. Pope Francis, in his 2015 encyclical letter Laudato si', notes that "an obsession with denying any pre-eminence to the human person" endangers the concern which should be shown to protecting and upholding the welfare of all people, which he argues should rank alongside the "care for our common home" which is the subject of his letter. In the same text he acknowledges that "a mistaken understanding" of Christian belief "has at times led us to justify mistreating nature, to exercise tyranny over creation": in such actions, Christian believers have "not [been] faithful to the treasures of wisdom which we have been called to protect and preserve. In his follow-up exhortation, Laudate Deum (2023) he refers to a preferable understanding of "the unique and central value of the human being amid the marvellous concert of all God's creatures" as a "situated anthropocentrism".

== Human rights ==
Anthropocentrism is the grounding for some naturalistic concepts of specifically human rights as opposed to animal rights extended to include the human species. Apologists of anthropocentrism argue that it is the necessary fundamental premise to defend universal human rights, since what matters morally is simply being human. For example, noted philosopher Mortimer J. Adler wrote, "Those who oppose injurious discrimination on the moral ground that all human beings, being equal in their humanity, should be treated equally in all those respects that concern their common humanity, would have no solid basis in fact to support their normative principle." Adler is stating here that denying what is now called human exceptionalism could lead to tyranny, writing that if humans ever came to believe that they do not possess a unique moral status, the intellectual foundation of their liberties collapses: "Why, then, should not groups of superior men be able to justify their enslavement, exploitation, or even genocide of inferior human groups on factual and moral grounds akin to those we now rely on to justify our treatment of the animals we harness as beasts of burden, that we butcher for food and clothing, or that we destroy as disease-bearing pests or as dangerous predators?"

Author and anthropocentrism apologist Wesley J. Smith from the Discovery Institute has written that human exceptionalism is what gives rise to human duties to each other, the natural world, and to treat animals humanely. Writing in A Rat is a Pig is a Dog is a Boy, a critique of animal rights ideology, "Because we are unquestionably a unique species—the only species capable of even contemplating ethical issues and assuming responsibilities—we uniquely are capable of apprehending the difference between right and wrong, good and evil, proper and improper conduct toward animals. Or to put it more succinctly, if being human isn't what requires us to treat animals humanely, what in the world does?"

== Moral status of animals ==
Anthropocentrism is closely related to the notion of speciesism, defined by Richard D. Ryder as a "a prejudice or attitude of bias in favour of the interests of members of one's own species and against those of members of other species".

=== Early critiques ===
One of the earliest critics of anthropocentrism was Edward Payson Evans in his book Evolutional Ethics and Animal Psychology (1897), where he challenges the idea that humans are fundamentally distinct from other sentient beings. He argues that anthropocentric psychology and ethics persist, treating humans as superior and denying mental or moral connections to other species. Evans suggests these beliefs stem from human self-importance, which overlooks the shared qualities of sentience across species and questions the ethical implications of such a view.

Later, J. Howard Moore, in The Universal Kinship (1906), expanded on this critique, asserting that Charles Darwin's On the Origin of Species (1859) "sealed the doom" of anthropocentrism. Moore argued that the doctrine of organic evolution, which established the common genesis of all animals, fundamentally altered humanity's view of its place in the natural world. Before the publication of The Origin of Species, humans may have been seen as distinct from other creatures, but with the advent of evolutionary theory, all species were recognized as sharing a common ancestry. Moore considered this shift one of the most significant intellectual developments, comparable to the groundbreaking insights of Galileo and Copernicus.

=== Challenging human exceptionalism ===
While humans cognition is relatively advanced, many traits traditionally used to justify humanity exceptionalism (such as rationality, emotional complexity and social bonds) are not unique to humans. Research in ethology has shown that non-human animals, such as primates, elephants, and cetaceans, also demonstrate complex social structures, emotional depth, and problem-solving abilities. This challenges the claim that humans possess qualities absent in other animals, and which would justify denying moral status to them.

=== Animal welfare perspectives ===
Animal welfare proponents attribute moral consideration to all sentient animals, proportional to their ability to have positive or negative mental experiences. It is notably associated with the ethical theory of utilitarianism, which aims to maximize well-being. It is notably defended by Peter Singer. According to David Pearce, "other things being equal, equally strong interests should count equally." Jeremy Bentham is also known for raising early the issue of animal welfare, arguing that "the question is not, Can they reason? nor, Can they talk? but, Can they suffer?". Animal welfare proponents can in theory accept animal exploitation if the benefits outweigh the harms. But in practice, they generally consider that intensive animal farming causes a massive amount of suffering that outweighs the relatively minor benefit that humans get from consuming animals.

=== Animal rights perspectives ===
Animal rights proponents argue that all animals have inherent rights, similar to human rights, and should not be used as means to human ends. Unlike animal welfare advocates, who focus on minimizing suffering, animal rights supporters often call for the total abolition of practices that exploit animals, such as intensive animal farming, animal testing, and hunting. Prominent figures like Tom Regan argue that animals are "subjects of a life" with inherent value, deserving moral consideration regardless of the potential benefits humans may derive from using them.

== In popular culture ==
In science fiction, humanocentrism is the idea that humans, as both beings and as a species, are the superior sentients. Essentially the equivalent of racial supremacy on a galactic scale, it entails intolerant discrimination against sentient non-humans, much like race supremacists discriminate against those not of their race. A prime example of this concept is utilized as a story element for the Mass Effect series. After humanity's first contact results in a brief war, many humans in the series develop suspicious or even hostile attitudes towards the game's various alien races. By the time of the first game, which takes place several decades after the war, many humans still retain such sentiments in addition to forming 'pro-human' organizations.

This idea is countered by anti-humanism. At times, this ideal also includes fear of and superiority over strong AIs and cyborgs, downplaying the ideas of integration, cybernetic revolts, machine rule and Tilden's Laws of Robotics.

Mark Twain mocked the belief in human supremacy in Letters from the Earth (written c. 1909, published 1962).

The Planet of the Apes franchise focuses on the analogy of apes becoming the dominant species in society and the fall of humans (see also human extinction). In the 1968 film, Taylor, a human states "take your stinking paws off me, you damn dirty ape!". In the 2001 film, this is contrasted with Attar (a gorilla)'s quote "take your stinking hands off me, you damn dirty human!". This links in with allusions that in becoming the dominant species apes are becoming more like humans (anthropomorphism). In the film Battle for the Planet of the Apes, Virgil, an orangutan states "ape has never killed ape, let alone an ape child. Aldo has killed an ape child. The branch did not break. It was cut with a sword." in reference to planned murder; a stereotypical human concept. Additionally, in Dawn of the Planet of the Apes, Caesar states "I always think...ape better than human. I see now...how much like them we are."

In George Orwell's novel Animal Farm, this theme of anthropocentrism is also present. Whereas originally the talking animals planned for liberation from humans and animal equality, as evident from the "seven commandments" such as "whatever goes upon two legs is an enemy", "Whatever goes upon four legs, or has wings, is a friend", "All animals are equal"; the pigs would later amend the commandments with statements such as "All animals are equal, but some animals are more equal than others", and "Four legs good, two legs better."

The 2012 documentary The Superior Human? systematically analyzes anthropocentrism and concludes that value is fundamentally an opinion, and since life forms naturally value their own traits, most humans are misled to believe that they are actually more valuable than other species. This natural bias, according to the film, combined with a received sense of comfort and an excuse for exploitation of non-humans cause anthropocentrism to remain in society.

In his 2009 book Eating Animals, Jonathan Foer describes anthropocentrism as "The conviction that humans are the pinnacle of evolution, the appropriate yardstick by which to measure the lives of other animals, and the rightful owners of everything that lives."

== See also ==
- Androcentrism
- Anthropic principle
- Anthropocene
- Anthropocentric embodied energy analysis
- Carbon chauvinism
- Ecocentrism
- Ecocriticism
- Existentialism
- Great ape personhood
- Great chain of being
- Gynocentrism
- Hot cognition
- Humanism
- Intrinsic value (animal ethics)
- Moral patienthood
- Object-oriented ontology
- Phallocentrism
- Sentiocentrism
- Speciesism
- Technocentrism
- Theocentrism
