= High modernism =

Science and tech-oriented modernism

High modernism (also known as high modernity) is a form of modernity, characterized by an unfaltering confidence in science and technology as means to reorder the social and natural world. The high modernist movement was particularly prevalent during the Cold War, especially in the late 1950s and 1960s.

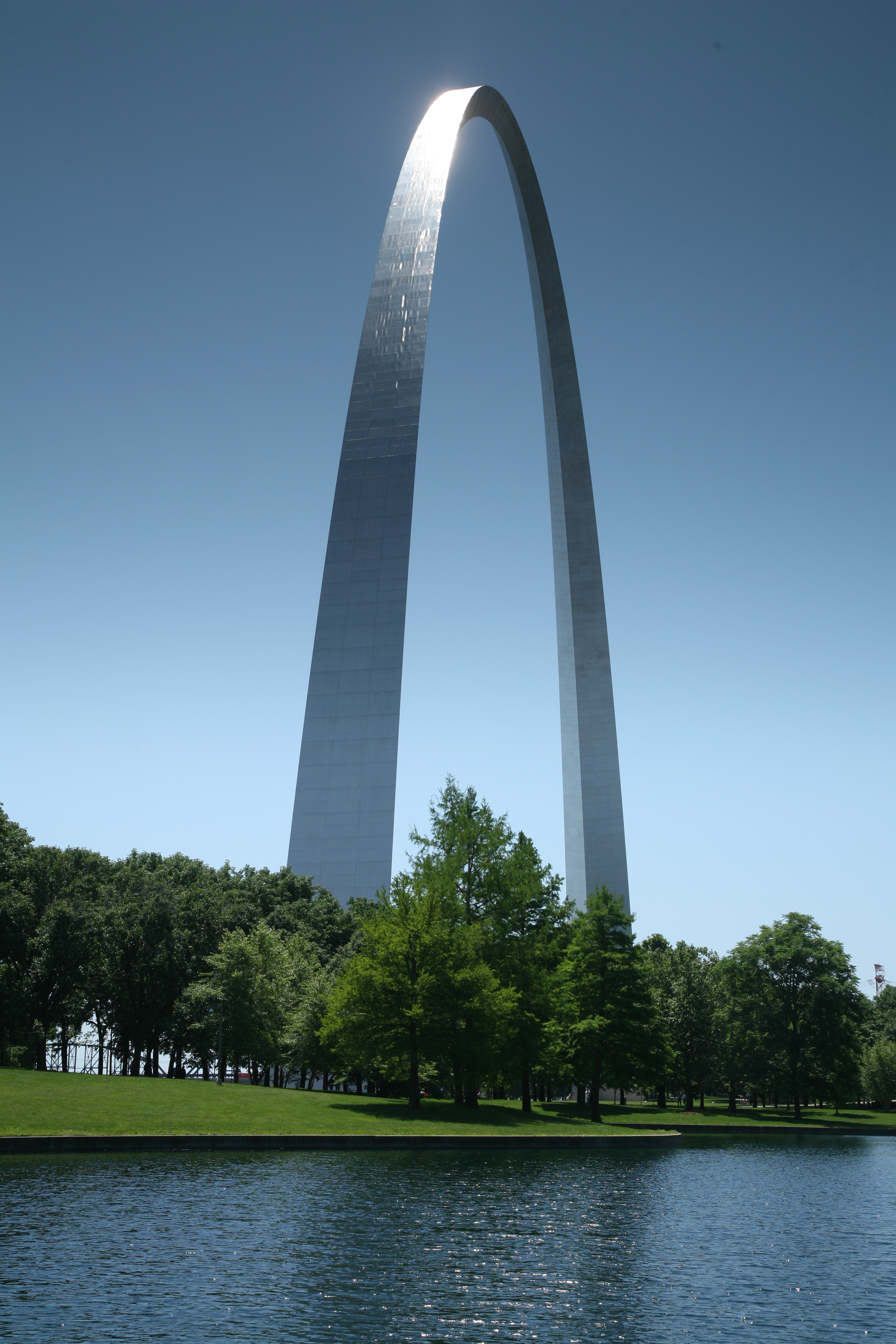
The St. Louis Gateway Arch, an iconic symbol of high modernity and its outlook, along with its modern urban planning project of a surrounding large park and car centric infrastructure.

== Definition ==
High modernity is distinguished by the following characteristics:

- Strong confidence in the potential for scientific and technological progress, including a reliance on the expertise of scientists, engineers, bureaucrats and other intellectuals.
- Attempts to master nature (including human nature) to meet human needs.
- An emphasis on rendering complex environments or concepts (such as old cities or social dynamics) legible, most often through spatial ordering (for example, city planning on a grid).
- Disregard for historical, geographical and social context in development.

=== Relation to modernity ===
Modernity relates to the modern era and the aesthetic qualities of modernism; however, modernity refers specifically to the social conditions and relations that arise out of the modern period, usually as a result of capitalism and industrialization. Thus, modernity can be understood as the state of society during and following the process of modernization.

Modernity and high modernity are concerned with human progress and the potential of human intervention to bring about positive change in the structure of society; however, high modernity's visions of societal change rely on the expertise of intellectuals and scientific innovation, making high modernity a more elitist project than its predecessor.

Both concepts operate on an ambiguous understanding of what the final stage of societal progress will entail. While modernity is retrospective in its prescriptions for the future and promotes organic growth, high modernity advocates a complete transformation of existing conditions and the creation of a blank slate. This break from the historical and geographical contexts of places often results in the application of standardized models to a variety of locations, often with socially disruptive consequences (see examples below).

Modernity and modernization are associated with capitalist and industrial development, and emphasize the increased movement of goods, people, capital and information (see Globalization). This emphasis on economic freedom and capitalism is accompanied by the decline of traditional forms of society and the rise of the nation-state. In contrast, high modernism transcends traditional political ideological divisions in its reordering of society towards a utopian ideal as such ideal societies are highly subjective across the political spectrum. Furthermore, projects characteristic of high modernity are best enacted under conditions of authoritarian and technocratic rule, as populations are more easily controlled and changed.

== Historical precedents ==
Despite its name, high modernism is not an exclusively modern phenomenon. One of the first manifestations of high modernism appeared in urban planning. In the 5th century BC, the Greek philosopher Hippodamus proposed the grid plan in urban planning, and implemented the grid plan in construction of Piraeus (the port of Athens), which has remained largely unchanged to this day.

Notably, our main source on Hippodamus is Aristotle, who criticized his grid plan in Politics II.8. Thus, criticism of high modernism also has a long history.

The Industrial Revolution was a major impetus of high modernism. In industrial production, standardization is necessary for economies of scale, and standardization necessarily increases legibility and homogenizes local context. The drive to standardization can be seen in Henry Ford's quote concerning consumer choice of Ford Model T: "You can have any color you want so long as it's black."

The high modernist method of governance has also been practiced in the East Asian cultural sphere for millennia. It originated in Legalism, which was adopted by the Qin dynasty (221 BC–206 BC). The Qin dynasty undertook massive standardization projects for the entire country, including measurement standards, currency, writing system, institution of a bureaucracy (replacing feudalism of the Zhou dynasty), and more practical details, such as the length of chariot axles. More controversially, the Qin dynasty also unified philosophy, with the promotion of Legalism and suppression of all other philosophies.

Although the brutality of the Qin regime contributed to its rapid collapse, the outcomes of its unification projects remained largely intact throughout history. The unification of philosophy remained intact too, but with Confucianism replacing Legalism.

The grid plan is a common motif in Chinese and Japanese capitals, which is visible in the maps of Chang'an, Beijing, and Heian-kyō.

== Modernization and development ==
=== Standardized legal names ===
Throughout most of human history, the act of naming is a local and informal affair. For example, the local names of geographical features depend critically on how they appear to the local people. The towns of Durham and Guilford in the state of Connecticut are connected by a road, which those who live in Durham call the “Guilford Road,” while those living in Guilford call it the “Durham Road.” The same informality and a focus on use over uniformity characterizes personal naming. For example, around the year 1700 in England, a mere eight given names accounted for nearly ninety percent of the total male population [John, Edward, William, Henry, Charles, James, Richard, Robert]. This did not pose a problem to local people, who would add informal by-names for disambiguation (“John-the-miller,” “John-the shepherd”). Furthermore, a personal name can change over time, as a person takes on new traits and loses old traits. It could also be different in different contexts, such as with nicknames, stage names, etc.

With modern state-building, the problem of illegible naming became acute. Consequently, a common naming system of Patronymic surname was promoted at the expense of informal local naming systems. Whereas in Europe, patronymy was the exception in 14th century, it became the norm in 19th century. This process reached its logical conclusion with the national identification number, which allows unique identification of any citizen across their entire lifespan. It is purely a naming system for the state administration, completely devoid of any personal or local meaning.

This state-sponsored standardization apparatus is clearly visible in Iceland, where the Icelandic Naming Committee maintains an official list of approved Icelandic given names.

=== Modernist housing ===
Modernist architecture is an architecture style based on modern construction materials, particularly glass, steel, and reinforced concrete, and the idea that form should follow function (functionalism). When applied to architecture intended for human residence, it is called modernist housing.

The main proponent of architectural modernism, Le Corbusier, designed the Unité d'habitation residential housing principle, and implemented it first in La Cité Radieuse, Marseille, completed in 1952. With 337 apartments of 23 different layouts, over 12 stories, all suspended on large pilotis, it remains popular and in use to this day. In 2016, it was added to the UNESCO World Heritage List for its importance to the development of modernist architecture.

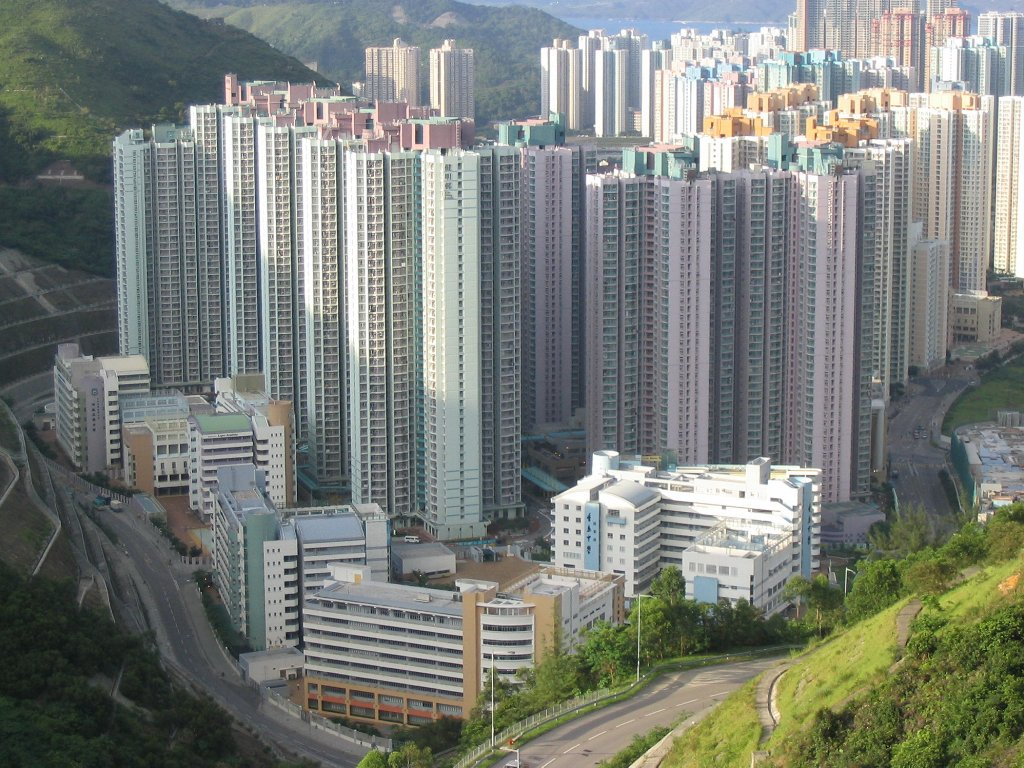
Kin Ming Estate, completed in 2003 in Tseung Kwan O, consists of 10 housing blocks of New Harmony I design, housing about 22,000 people.

Modernist housing has been implemented extensively in the form of high-rise apartment buildings in Asian cities with high urban densities. Two illustrative examples are Hong Kong and Singapore. In Hong Kong in the year 2020, 2.1 million residents were in public housing, which is 28% of the total population. In terms of households, 0.8 million households were in public housing, which is 43% of all households.

In Singapore, public housing is administered by the Housing and Development Board, first formed in 1960. While its original mission was to build cheap flats for the poor, it later expanded its mission to plan and develop public housing for all Singapore residents. In the year 2020, 78.7% residents live in public housing, decreasing from a high of 88.0% in 2000. There was a concurrent rise in residents living private condominiums and other kinds of apartments, from 6.5% to 16.0%. The rest 5% live in "landed properties", a proportion that remained stable since 2000.

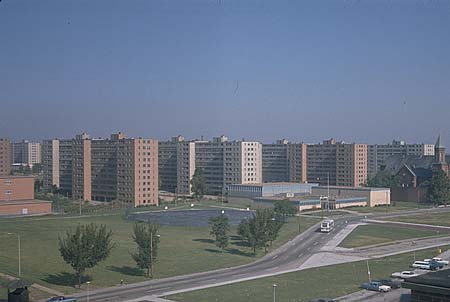
For many critics of high modernism, the Pruitt–Igoe housing project illustrated both the essential unlivability of Bauhaus-inspired box architecture, and the hubris of central planning. Its demolition on July 15, 1972, was the day “modern architecture died”, according to Charles Jencks.

Despite its origin in the west, modernist housing projects have met with far less success in Western countries. The most iconic failure is the Pruitt–Igoe housing project, a housing complex of 33 buildings, of 11 stories each, first occupied in 1954. Living conditions rapidly deteriorated, and it was demolished in 1972. It came to become a symbol of the failures of urban renewal, public-policy planning and public housing. Some, such as the architectural historian Charles Jencks, and journalist Tom Wolfe, argued that it demonstrated the error of architectural modernism itself.

These claims are problematized both by the long-term functioning of modernist housing projects outside of the United States, as well as by multiple counter-narratives developed within, such as explaining that the tenant selection process selected people unprepared for urban living, or that the geometry of design precluded the direct surveillance for preventing crime. The legacy of Pruitt–Igoe remains contested, both between architects concerning the benefits and faults of architectural modernism, and between general political observers concerning the benefits and faults of public housing, or high modernism in general.

=== Development in the Soviet Union ===
Despite its frequent association with the West, high modernism also took root in the Soviet Union, particularly under Nikita Khrushchev. Following Joseph Stalin's death, Khrushchev reoriented Soviet policy to embrace many features of Western scientific modernity, filtered through a socialist lens. Soviet high modernism emphasized the role of rational planning, scientific expertise, and state-directed progress as tools to eliminate exploitation and social inequality.

In the social sphere, the Soviet vision extended beyond economic development, aspiring to reconstruct society itself through the cultivation of the “New Soviet Man” a selfless, collectivist citizen devoted to the goals of socialism.

While both the United States and the Soviet Union sought to modernize the developing world during the Cold War, it was the authoritarian regimes, particularly the USSR, that most enthusiastically embraced high modernism as a comprehensive blueprint for state-led transformation.

In practice, Soviet high modernism manifested in both architectural reform and large-scale infrastructure projects. Khrushchev’s tenure saw the mass construction of Khrushchyovka apartments: prefabricated, utilitarian housing units designed for speed, efficiency, and affordability. At the same time, the USSR invested heavily in scientific facilities, hydroelectric dams, and transportation networks, all intended to demonstrate the power of socialist planning and progress.

These developments were not just economic; they also aimed to reshape social life. Urban environments were redesigned to encourage collectivist living, discourage class stratification, and model a technologically advanced, post-capitalist society. In this way, the Soviet variant of high modernism blended utopian ambition with rigid state planning.

=== Development in the third world ===
Geographer Peter J. Taylor argues that high modernism is predicated upon a false optimism in the transformative power of science and technology contributed to confusion in the modernization process, especially in the case of third world countries striving to develop according to Western principles of modernization.

Following the successes of the Marshall Plan in Europe, economists turned their attention towards development in the Third World in the aftermath of the Second World War. Contemporary development theory stressed the necessity of capital accumulation and modernization in order for underdeveloped countries in Asia, Africa and Latin America to 'catch up' to the developed Western nations. Post-World War II development schemes were problematized by a focus on economy (ignoring the political, social and institutional impediments to growth), as well as its assumption that conditions in developing countries were the same as those in Europe that experienced success under the Marshall Plan. Modernization theory built upon previous ideas of sociocultural evolution from the previous century, constructing a global hierarchy based on economic development. In this worldview, Western countries were the most developed, while the rest of the world (particularly countries that had just experienced decolonization) still possessed traditional, pre-modern economies. In order to advance beyond this traditional state, the third world would therefore need to emulate developed Western countries, through optimistic social engineering endeavours.

The overwhelming enthusiasm for the power of science and technology to manage the human and natural world encouraged regimes to attempt monumental development projects that would rapidly catapult developing countries into Western-style development. High modernism emphasized spatial order as rational design; by standardizing, simplifying and ordering physical space, otherwise complex concepts or entities could be made legible and more easily controlled, including economies.

=== Brasília ===
During the first half of the twentieth century, Brazil was a primarily agricultural nation that was economically reliant on the United States. Beginning in the 1950s, Brazilian elites sought to reinvent Brazil's economy through import substitution industrialization. The modernization of the Brazilian economy was also accompanied by grand designs to improve education, culture, health care, transportation systems, community organization, property distribution, and administration in order to spark a new sense of national agency in the population.

Part of the vision for Brazil's future was the relocation of the nation's capital from the coastal Rio de Janeiro to a new inland site named Brasília. Located in the wilderness, Brasília was to be a “single-function, strictly administrative capital,” says political scientist and anthropologist James C. Scott. Here, plans for a new capital were finally able to come to fruition thanks to global support for the potential of technology. Brasília's large scale, design, and cultural offerings, built from the forests of Brazil made it a manifestation of modernity. The project's chief architect, Oscar Niemeyer, was strongly influenced by Soviet modernism in his prescriptions for the new capital as the Soviet Union began to slowly open up to the rest of the world in a new period of internationalism. Despite the cultural and ideological differences of the two countries, both shared common ground in need for modernization and state authority.

The new Brazilian capital was completed in under four years and was presented to the world upon its completion in 1960 as the epitome of urban modernism. The city was planned as a manifestation of Brazil's future as a modern, industrialized power, creating a completely new city that would then create a new society. Based on the master plans of the Congrès International d’Architecture Moderne (CIAM), Brasília's urban space was oriented around mobility, uniformity and functionality, achieved through the elimination of corridor streets (seen as the source of disease and criminality) and the creation of indistinguishable residence sectors based on occupation, known as ‘’superquadra’’.

Total state control of development was critical to the creation of utopian high modernist cities by the CIAM, as it prevented conflict between the planned ideal society and the incoherence of imposing this model on existing conditions.

Following the completion of the city, it became apparent that Brasília’s high modernist design had overlooked the complexities of urban space and had overestimated the ability of functional, rational design to improve socio-political order. Planners’ focus on orienting mobility in the city around automobile traffic had eliminated the street as a place for public gathering; the removal of street corners in favour of cul-de-sacs and open space (punctuated by monumental sculptural and architectural forms like the Cathedral of Brasília and the National Congress Building) discouraged pedestrian traffic, traditional social networking and organic growth of public space. The organization of Brasília's settlement similarly restricted social space by collectivizing residents according to their occupation in the ‘’superquadra’’, transforming the private sphere of the home into a space where the individual was ‘symbolically minimized.’ While these ‘’superquadra’’ featured their own educational, entertainment, recreational and retail facilities to meet any perceivable need of the city’s residents, these perceived needs were based on European models from CIAM and architect Le Corbusier. Furthermore, the aesthetic monotony and scale of the city’s built environment created feelings of isolation, forced conformity and disorientation among residents; there also existed a stark contrast between the wealthier residents living in the centre of the city and the poorer residents situated along the city’s margins.

=== Inuit and the Canadian military ===
State reliance on high modernity to control human populations during the Cold War was not limited to the US. In Canada, the construction of the Distant Early Warning Line increased Euro-Canadian activity in the north, disrupting the traditional lifestyle of local Inuit populations and the arctic landscape in the process. Prime Minister John Diefenbaker's promise to build "a nation in the [north] ... patterned on our way of life" resulted in towns and houses patterned on southern Canadian models that ignored the cultural and geographical context of the Arctic.

The newly constructed towns of Frobisher Bay and Inuvik were ambitiously designed by federal officials to overcome the previously 'uninhabitable' arctic environment and rapidly incorporate the Inuit into the modern age; however, the disregard for the local conditions and opinions of northerners resulted in spatial segregation of Inuit and military personnel in the two towns. In pursuit of a modernized, self-sufficient northern settlement, state-led projects to stabilize the nomadic Inuit in towns disrupted native resource-based economies and contributed to spatial segregation, social inequity, health problems and cultural dislocation.

== In the arts ==
=== Visual arts and music ===
Cultural critic Bram Dijkstra criticizes "high modernism" as an austere, abstract, and anti-humanist vision of modernism:

Much of the post-WWII high modernism in America and the rest of the western world is antihumanist, hostile to notions of community, of any form of humanism. It becomes about the lack of meaning, the need to create our own significance out of nothing. The highest level of significance, that of the elite, becomes abstraction. So the concept of the evolutionary elite arises again, deliberately excluding those who 'haven't evolved.'

High modernism is exemplified in the writings of Clement Greenberg, who described an opposition between "avant-garde" art and "kitsch" in his essay Avant-Garde and Kitsch. Composer Milton Babbitt's well-known essay "Who Cares if You Listen" describes "efficiency", an increase in "the number of functions associated with each component", "a high degree of contextuality and autonomy", and an "extension of the methods of other musics" as being among the traits possessed by contemporary serious music, though the words "modernism" and "modernist" do not occur in the article, and "modern" occurs only in a quotation with reference to Beethoven and Tchaikovsky.

=== Literature ===
The term "high modernism" as used in literary criticism generally lacks the pejorative connotations it has in other contexts. High literary modernism, on the contrary, is generally used to describe a subgenre of literary modernism, and generally encompasses works published between the end of the First World War and the beginning of the Second. Regardless of the specific year it was produced, high modernism is characterized primarily by a complete and unambiguous embrace of what Andreas Huyssen calls the "Great Divide". That is, it believes that there is a clear distinction between capital-A Art and mass culture, and it places itself firmly on the side of Art and in opposition to popular or mass culture. (Postmodernism, according to Huyssen, may be defined precisely by its rejection of this distinction.)

== See also ==
- High culture
- High Middle Ages, a periodization correspondent to high modernity
- Fordism
- Manifest Destiny
- New Frontier
- Scientism
- Technocentrism
- Technological utopianism
- Techno-progressivism
- Progress
- United States in the 1950s
