= Coprographia =

Involuntarily writing or drawing obscenities

Coprographia is involuntarily making vulgar writings or drawings. The word comes from the Greek κόπρος (kópros), meaning "feces", and γραφή (graphḗ), meaning "writing". Related terms are coprolalia, the involuntary usage of obscene and/or profane words, and copropraxia, the involuntary performance of obscene gestures. It should not be confused with the behavior of smearing actual feces, which is called scatolia.
