= Coprolalia =

Involuntary utterance of socially inappropriate words

Coprolalia (/ˌkɒprəˈleɪliə/ KOP-rə-LAY-lee-ə) is involuntary swearing or the involuntary utterance of obscene words or socially inappropriate and derogatory remarks. The word comes from the Greek κόπρος (kópros), meaning "dung, feces", and λαλιά (laliā́) "speech", from λαλεῖν (laleîn) "to talk".

Coprolalia is an occasional characteristic of tic disorders, in particular Tourette syndrome, although it is not required for a diagnosis of Tourette's and only about 10% of individuals with Tourette's exhibit coprolalia. It is not unique to tic disorders; it may also present itself as a neurological disorder.

Coprolalia is one type of coprophenomenon. Other coprophenomena include the related symptoms of copropraxia, involuntary actions such as performing obscene or forbidden gestures, and coprographia, making obscene writings or drawings.

== Characteristics ==
Coprolalia encompasses the uncontrollable utterance of words and phrases that are culturally taboo or generally unsuitable for acceptable social use, when used out of context. The term is not used to describe contextual swearing. It is usually expressed out of social or emotional context, and may be spoken in a louder tone or different cadence or pitch than normal conversation. It can be a single word, or complex phrases. A person with coprolalia may repeat the word mentally rather than saying it out loud; these subvocalizations can be very distressing.

Coprolalia is an occasional characteristic of Tourette syndrome, although it is not required for a diagnosis of Tourette's. Typically, symptoms of coprolalia follow the development of phonic or motor tics by four to seven years. The severity of symptoms tends to peak during adolescence and subside during adulthood. In Tourette syndrome, compulsive swearing can be uncontrollable and undesired by the person uttering the phrases. Involuntary outbursts, such as racial or ethnic slurs in the company of those most offended by such remarks, can be particularly embarrassing. The phrases uttered by a person with coprolalia do not necessarily reflect the thoughts or opinions of the person as they are unconsciously produced.

It may occur after traumatic brain injury such as stroke and encephalitis; in other neurological conditions such as choreoacanthocytosis, seizures, and Lesch–Nyhan syndrome; and rarely in persons with dementia or obsessive-compulsive disorder in the absence of tics.

== Brain regions implicated ==
The neural mechanisms underlying the presence of coprolalia alone are poorly understood. Current research is designed to locate the brain regions that are active during an involuntary tic. Individuals with Tourette Syndrome (TS) exhibit the symptoms of coprolalia, so researchers can study subjects with TS to deduce an etiology for phonic tics. Patterns of neural activity were tracked by using Positron Emission Tomography (PET) scans. The activity of the frontal operculum and Broca's area (Brodmann's area 44 and 45), may be responsible for the initiation of these vocal tics. Both of these brain areas are responsible for planning and producing speech, which are active during coprolalic vocal tic episodes.

Limbic system structures such as the posterior cingulate cortex are also activated during coprolalic vocal tics. This region of the brain is responsible for emotional processing, so its increase in activation could reveal insights as to how taboo words may be organized differently than the neurolinguistic aspect of the brain.

== Prevalence in Tourette syndrome ==
Only about 10% of people with Tourette's exhibit coprolalia, but it tends to attract more attention than any other symptom.

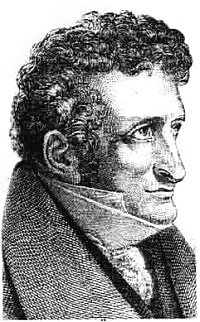
Jean Marc Gaspard Itard was credited with describing the first case of Tourette syndrome, including coprolalia, in the Marquise de Dampierre, a woman of nobility

There is a low number of epidemiological studies on Tourette syndrome due to ascertainment bias affecting clinical studies. Studies on people with Tourette's often "came from tertiary referral samples, the sickest of the sick". Further, the criteria for Tourette's syndrome changed in 2000 when the impairment criterion was removed from the DSM-IV-TR for all tic disorders. This resulted in an increase of diagnoses in milder cases. Additionally, many clinical studies suffer from small sample size. These factors combine to render older estimates of coprolalia occurrences outdated.

An international, multi-site database of 3,500 individuals with Tourette syndrome drawn from clinical samples found 14% of people with Tourette's accompanied by comorbid conditions had coprolalia, while only 6% of those with uncomplicated ("pure") Tourette's had coprolalia. The same study found that the chance of having coprolalia increased linearly with the number of comorbid conditions: individuals with four or five other conditions—in addition to tics—were four to six times more likely to have coprolalia than persons with only Tourette's.

== Management ==
Botulinum toxin (botox) may be injected near the vocal cords. This does not prevent the vocalizations, but the partial paralysis that results may help control the volume of any outbursts. Botox injections result in more generalized relief of tics than the vocal relief expected.

== In deaf individuals ==
Coprolalia has also been documented in deaf individuals. Non-verbal phonic tics are referred to as "signing phonic tics" in deaf individuals. Coprolalia in signing individuals is characterized by uncontrollable fingerspelling of obscene and inappropriate words and phrases, the production of intercourse-related signs, flicking middle fingers, or compulsive repetition of signs. Tourette syndrome is extremely understudied in the deaf community, often being misdiagnosed as schizophrenia. Researchers are still studying the relationship between deafness and Tourette syndrome to combat misdiagnosis.

== Society and culture ==
The entertainment industry often depicts those with Tourette syndrome as being social misfits whose only tic is coprolalia, which has furthered stigmatization and the public's misunderstanding of those with Tourette's. The coprolalic symptoms of Tourette's are also fodder for radio and television talk shows.

== See also ==
- List of language disorders
