= Edward Payson Evans =

American scholar (1831–1917)

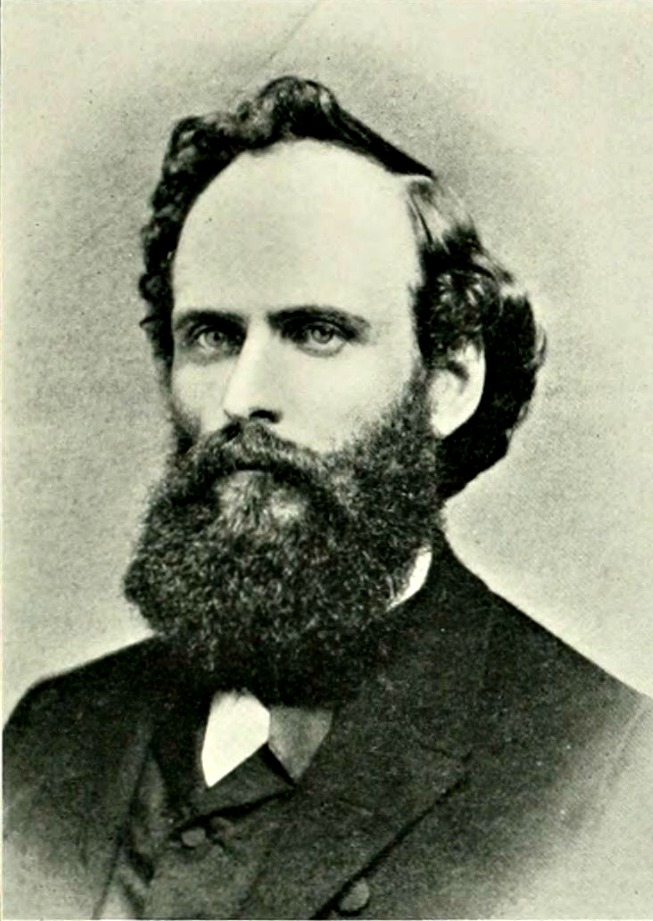
- Portrait from History of the University of Michigan (1906)
- Born: December 8, 1831; Remsen, New York, U.S.
- Died: March 6, 1917 (aged 85); New York City, U.S.
- Education: University of Michigan (B.A., 1854)
- Occupations: Scholar; linguist; educator
- Years active: 1855–1917
- Notable work: Evolutional Ethics and Animal Psychology (1897); The Criminal Prosecution and Capital Punishment of Animals (1906)
- Spouse: Elizabeth Edson Gibson (m. 1868; died 1911)

Edward Payson Evans (December 8, 1831 – March 6, 1917) was an American scholar, linguist, and educator. Educated at the University of Michigan, he taught modern languages in the United States before continuing his studies in Germany, where he spent much of his career. Evans wrote on German literature, comparative linguistics, animal trials, and the ethical status of animals. His books included Evolutional Ethics and Animal Psychology (1897), which discussed evolutionary theory, moral philosophy, and animal consciousness, and The Criminal Prosecution and Capital Punishment of Animals (1906), a study of historical legal proceedings against animals in Europe.

== Biography ==
Evans was born in Remsen, New York, on December 8, 1831. His father was the Reverend Evan Evans, a Welsh Presbyterian clergyman. Evans earned a Bachelor of Arts from the University of Michigan in 1854. He taught at an academy in Hernando, Mississippi, in 1855, and was a professor at Carroll College in Waukesha, Wisconsin, from 1856 to 1857.

From 1858 to 1862, Evans studied at the University of Göttingen, the Friedrich Wilhelm University of Berlin, and the Ludwig-Maximilians-Universität München. After returning to the United States, he became professor of modern languages at the University of Michigan. In 1868, he married Elizabeth Edson Gibson. In 1870, he resigned from Michigan and returned to Europe, where he collected material for a history of German literature and studied oriental languages.

While living in Munich, Evans worked regularly at the Royal Library of Munich and joined the staff of the political journal Allgemeine Zeitung in 1884. After his wife's death in 1911 and the outbreak of the First World War in 1914, he returned to the United States. He lived in Cambridge, Massachusetts, and New York City.

Evans died at his home in New York City on March 6, 1917.

== Reception ==
Evans' 1906 book The Criminal Prosecution and Capital Punishment of Animals has been described as a major work on animal trials. Aleks Pluskowski has criticized parts of the book's interpretation and documentation.

Environmental historian Roderick Nash wrote that Evans and J. Howard Moore "deserve more recognition than they have received as the first professional philosophers in the United States to look beyond anthropocentrism". Bernard E. Rollin cited Evans' Evolutional Ethics and Animal Psychology as an example of writing by contemporaries of Darwin who used evolutionary theory in arguments for the ethical treatment of animals.

== Publications ==
=== Articles ===
- "Linguistic Paleontology", The Atlantic Monthly, Vol. 53, Iss. 5, May 1884, pp. 613–622
- "Bugs and Beasts before the Law", The Atlantic Monthly, Vol. 54, Iss. 2, Aug. 1884, pp. 235–247
- "Artists and Art Life in Munich", Cosmopolitan, Vol. 9, Iss. 1, May 1890, pp. 3–13
- "Speech as a Barrier Between Man and Beast", The Atlantic Monthly, Vol. 68, Iss. 3, Sept. 1891, pp. 299–312
- "The Nearness of Animals to Men", The Atlantic Monthly, Volume 69, Iss. 2, Feb. 1892, pp. 171–184
- "Ethical Relations Between Man and Beast", Popular Science Monthly, Volume 45, Sept. 1894

=== Books ===
- Abriss der deutschen Literaturgeschichte (New York: Leypoldt & Holt, 1869)
- A Progressive German Reader: With notes and a Complete Vocabulary (New York: Holt & Williams, 1869)
- Animal Symbolism in Art and Literature (London: W. Heinemann, 1896)
- Animal Symbolism in Ecclesiastical Architecture (New York: H. Holt and Company, 1896)
- Evolutional Ethics and Animal Psychology (New York: D. Appleton & Company, 1897)
- History of German Literature (in 5 vols., 1898)
- The Criminal Prosecution and Capital Punishment of Animals (London: W. Heinemann, 1906)

=== Translations ===
- Adolf Stahr, The Life and Works of Gotthold Ephraim Lessing (with an introduction; 2 vols., Boston, 1866)
- Athanase Josué Coquerel, First Historical Transformations of Christianity (1867)
