= Deep ecology =

Ecological and environmental philosophy

Deep ecology is an environmental philosophy that promotes the inherent worth of all living beings regardless of their instrumental utility to human needs, and argues that modern human societies should be restructured in accordance with such ideas.

Deep ecologists argue that the natural world is a complex of relationships in which the existence of organisms is dependent on the existence of others within ecosystems. They argue that non-vital human interference with or destruction of the natural world poses a threat not only to humans, but to all organisms that make up the natural order.

Deep ecology's core principle is the belief that the living environment as a whole should be respected and regarded as having certain basic moral and legal rights to live and flourish, independent of its instrumental benefits for human use. Deep ecology is often framed in terms of the idea of a much broader sociality: it recognizes diverse communities of life on Earth that are composed not only through biotic factors but also, where applicable, through ethical relations, that is, the valuing of other beings as more than just resources. It is described as "deep" because it is regarded as looking more deeply into the reality of humanity's relationship with the natural world, arriving at philosophically more profound conclusions than those of mainstream environmentalism.

The movement does not subscribe to anthropocentric environmentalism (which is concerned with conservation of the environment only for exploitation by and for human purposes), since deep ecology is grounded in a different set of philosophical assumptions. Deep ecology takes a holistic view of the world humans live in and seeks to apply to life the understanding that the separate parts of the ecosystem (including humans) function as a whole. The philosophy addresses core principles of different environmental and green movements and advocates a system of environmental ethics advocating wilderness preservation, non-coercive policies encouraging human population decline, animism and simple living.

== Origins and history ==
In his original 1973 deep ecology paper, Arne Næss stated that he was inspired by ecologists who were studying the ecosystems throughout the world. Næss also made clear that he felt the real motivation to "free nature" was spiritual and intuitive. "Your motivation comes from your total view or your philosophical, religious opinions," he said, "so that you feel, when you are working in favour of free nature, you are working for something within your self, that ... demands changes. So you are motivated from what I call 'deeper premises'."

In a 2014 essay, environmentalist George Sessions identified three people active in the 1960s whom he considered foundational to the movement: author and conservationist Rachel Carson, environmentalist David Brower, and biologist Paul R. Ehrlich. Sessions considers the publication of Carson's 1962 seminal book Silent Spring as the beginning of the contemporary deep ecology movement. Næss also considered Carson the originator of the movement, stating "Eureka, I have found it" upon encountering her writings.

Another event cited as foundational to the movement was the publication in the 1960s of photographs of Earth from space taken by the Apollo astronauts.

== Principles ==
Deep ecology proposes an embracing of ecological ideas and environmental ethics (that is, proposals about how humans should relate to nature). It is also a social movement based on a holistic vision of the world. Deep ecologists hold that the survival of any part is dependent upon the well-being of the whole, and criticise the narrative of human supremacy, which they say has not been a feature of most cultures throughout human evolution.

Deep ecology presents an eco-centric (Earth-centred) view, rather than the anthropocentric (human-centred) view, developed in its most recent form by philosophers of the Enlightenment, such as Newton, Bacon, and Descartes. Proponents of deep ecology oppose the narrative that man is separate from nature, is in charge of nature, or is the steward of nature, or that nature exists as a resource to be freely exploited. They cite the fact that indigenous peoples under-exploited their environment and retained a sustainable society for thousands of years, as evidence that human societies are not necessarily destructive by nature. They believe that the current materialist paradigm must be replaced – as Næss pointed out, this involves more than merely getting rid of capitalism and the concept of economic growth, or "progress", that is critically endangering the biosphere. "We need changes in society such that reason and emotion support each other," states Næss: "... not only a change in a technological and economic system, but a change that touches all the fundamental aspects of industrial societies. This is what I mean by a change of 'system'."

Deep ecologists believe that the damage to natural systems sustained since the industrial revolution now threatens social collapse and possible extinction of humans, and are striving to bring about the kind of ideological, economic and technological changes Næss mentioned. Deep ecology claims that ecosystems can absorb damage only within certain parameters, and contends that civilization endangers the biodiversity of the Earth. Deep ecologists have suggested that the human population must be substantially reduced, but advocate a gradual decrease in population rather than any apocalyptic solution

In a 1982 interview, Arne Næss commented that a global population of 100 million (0.1 billion) would be desirable. However, others have argued that a population of 1–2 billion would be compatible with the deep ecological worldview. Deep ecology eschews traditional left wing–right wing politics, but is viewed as radical ("Deep Green") in its opposition to capitalism, and its advocacy of an ecological paradigm.

Unlike conservation, deep ecology does not advocate the controlled preservation of the landbase, but rather "non-interference" with natural diversity except for vital needs. In citing humans as being responsible for excessive environmental destruction, deep ecologists actually refer to "humans within civilization, especially industrial civilization", accepting the fact that the vast majority of humans who have ever lived did not live in environmentally destructive societies – the excessive damage to the biosphere has been sustained mostly over the past hundred years.

In 1985, Bill Devall and George Sessions summed up their understanding of the concept of deep ecology with the following eight points:

- The well-being of human and nonhuman life on earth is of intrinsic value irrespective of its value to humans.
- The diversity of life-forms is part of this value.
- Humans have no right to reduce this diversity except to satisfy vital human needs
- The flourishing of human and nonhuman life is compatible with a substantial decrease in human population.
- Humans have interfered with nature to a critical level already, and interference is worsening.
- Policies must be changed, affecting current economic, technological and ideological structures.
- This ideological change should focus on an appreciation of the quality of life rather than adhering to an increasingly high standard of living.
- All those who agree with the above tenets have an obligation to implement them.

== Development ==
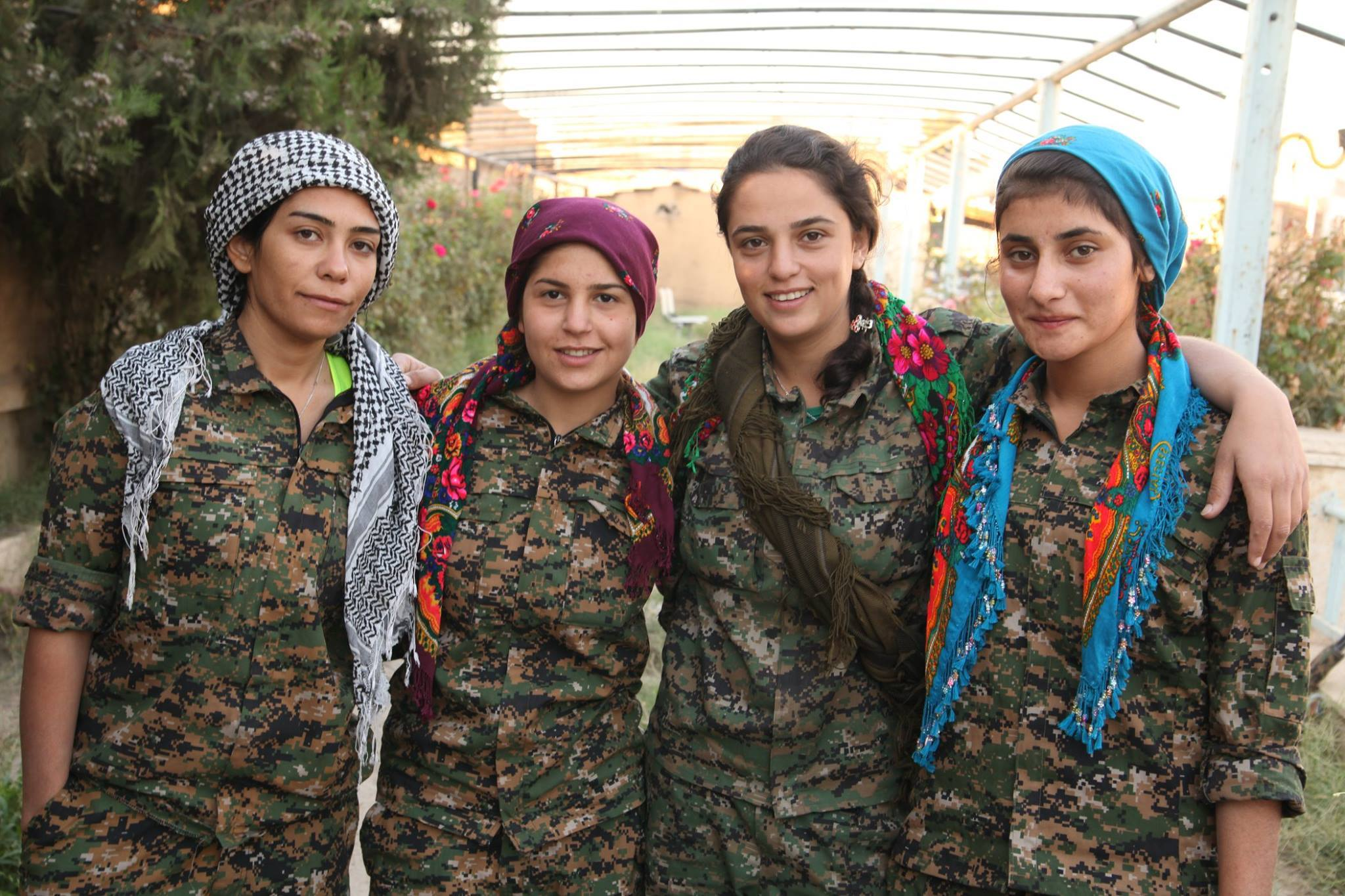
YPJ members in a greenhouse farm, for ecological cooperative farming in Rojava (AANES)

The phrase "Deep Ecology" first appeared in a 1973 article by the Norwegian philosopher Arne Næss. Næss referred to "biospherical egalitarianism-in principle", which he explained was "an intuitively clear and obvious value axiom. Its restriction to humans is ... anthropocentrism with detrimental effects upon the life quality of humans themselves... The attempt to ignore our dependence and to establish a master-slave role has contributed to the alienation of man from himself." Næss added that from a deep ecology point of view "the right of all forms [of life] to live is a universal right which cannot be quantified. No single species of living being has more of this particular right to live and unfold than any other species".

== Sources ==
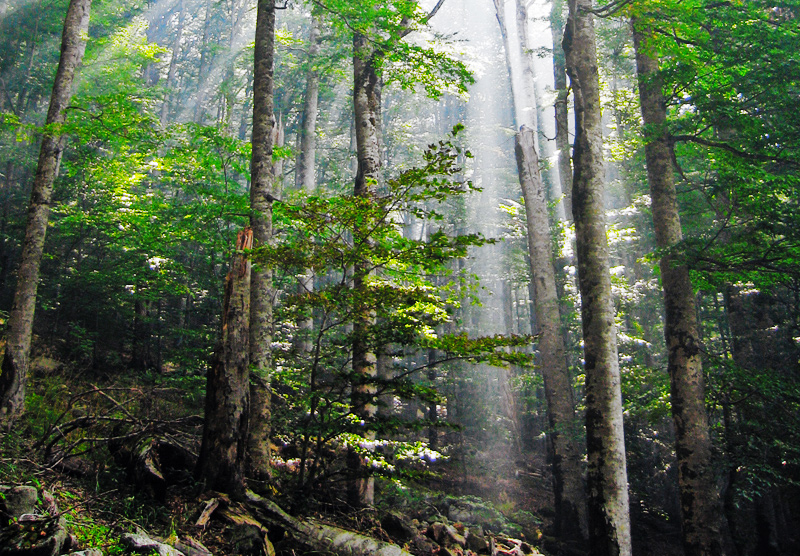
Old-growth forest in Biogradska Gora National Park, Montenegro.

Deep ecology is an eco-philosophy derived from intuitive ethical principles. It does not claim to be a science, although it is based generally on the new physics, which, in the early 20th century, undermined the reductionist approach and the notion of objectivity, demonstrating that humans are an integral part of nature; this is a common concept always held by primal peoples.

Devall and Sessions, however, note that the work of many ecologists has encouraged the adoption of an "ecological consciousness", quoting environmentalist Aldo Leopold's view that such a consciousness "changes the role of Homo sapiens from conqueror of the land community to plain member and citizen of it."

Though some detractors assert that deep ecology is based on the discredited idea of the "balance of nature", deep ecologists have made no such claim. They do not dispute the theory that human cultures can have a benevolent effect on the landbase, only the idea of the control of nature, or human supremacy, which is the central pillar of the industrial paradigm. The tenets of deep ecology state that humans have no right to interfere with natural diversity except for vital needs: the distinction between "vital" and "other needs" cannot be drawn precisely. Deep ecologists reject any mechanical or computer model of nature, and see the Earth as a living organism, which should be treated and understood accordingly.

== Aspects ==
=== Environmental education ===
In 2010, Richard Kahn promoted the movement of ecopedagogy, proposing using radical environmental activism as an educational principle to teach students to support "earth democracy" which promotes the rights of animals, plants, fungi, algae and bacteria. The biologist Dr. Stephan Harding has developed the concept of "holistic science", based on principles of ecology and deep ecology. In contrast with materialist, reductionist science, holistic science studies natural systems as a living whole. He writes:

We encourage ... students to use [their] sense of belonging to an intelligent universe (revealed by deep experience), for deeply questioning their fundamental beliefs, and for translating these beliefs into personal decisions, lifestyles and actions. The emphasis on action is important. This is what makes deep ecology a movement as much as a philosophy.

=== Spirituality ===
Deep ecologist and physicist Frijof Capra has said that "[Deep] ecology and spirituality are fundamentally connected because deep ecological awareness is, ultimately, spiritual awareness."

Arne Næss commented that he was inspired by the work of Spinoza and Gandhi, both of whom based their values on grounds of religious feeling and experience. Though he regarded deep ecology as a spiritual philosophy, he explained that he was not a "believer" in the sense of following any particular articles of religious dogma. "...it is quite correct to say that I have sometimes been called religious or spiritual", he said, "because I believe that living creatures have an intrinsic worth of their own, and also that there are fundamental intuitions about what is unjust."

Næss criticised the Judeo-Christian tradition, stating the Bible's "arrogance of stewardship consists in the idea of superiority which underlies the thought that we exist to watch over nature like a highly respected middleman between the Creator and Creation". Næss further criticizes the reformation's view of creation as property to be put into maximum productive use.

However, Næss added that while he felt the word "God" was "too loaded with preconceived ideas", he accepted Spinoza's idea of God as "immanent" – "a single creative force [...] constantly creating the world by being the creative force in Nature." He did not, he said, "exclude the possibility that Christian theological principles are true in a certain sense."

Joanna Macy in "the Work that Reconnects" integrates Buddhist philosophy with a deep ecological viewpoint.

== Criticisms ==
=== Eurocentric bias ===
Guha and Martínez Alier critique the four defining characteristics of deep ecology. First, because deep ecologists believe that environmental movements must shift from an anthropocentric to an ecocentric approach, they fail to recognize the two most fundamental ecological crises facing the world: overconsumption in the global north and increasing militarization. Second, deep ecology's emphasis on wilderness provides impetus for the imperialist yearning of the West. Lastly, because deep ecology equates environmental protection with wilderness preservation its radical elements are confined within the American wilderness preservationist movement.

While deep ecologists accept that overconsumption and militarization are major issues, they point out that the impulse to save wilderness is intuitive and has no connection with imperialism. This claim by Guha and Martínez Alier, in particular, closely resembles statements made, for instance, by Brazilian president Jair Bolsonaro declaring Brazil's right to cut down the Amazon Rainforest. "The Amazon belongs to Brazil and European countries can mind their own business because they have already destroyed their own environment." The inference is clearly that, since European countries have already destroyed their environment, Brazil also has the right to do so: deep ecological values should not apply to them, as they have not yet had their 'turn' at maximum economic growth.

With regard to "appropriating spiritual beliefs", Arne Næss pointed out that the essence of deep ecology is the belief that "all living creatures have their own intrinsic value, a value irrespective of the use they might have for mankind." Næss stated that supporters of the deep ecology movement came from various different religious and spiritual traditions, and were united in this one belief, albeit basing it on various different values.

=== Deep versus Shallowness ===
When Arne Næss coined the term deep ecology, he compared it favourably with shallow ecology which he criticized for its utilitarian and anthropocentric attitude to nature and for its materialist and consumer-oriented outlook, describing its "central objective" as "the health and affluence of people in the developed countries." William D. Grey believes that developing a non-anthropocentric set of values is "a hopeless quest". He seeks an improved "shallow" view. Deep ecologists point out, however, that "shallow ecology" (resource management conservation) is counter-productive, since it serves mainly to support capitalism, the means through which industrial civilization destroys the biosphere. The eco-centric view thus only becomes "hopeless" within the structures and ideology of civilization. Outside it, however, a non-anthropocentric world view has characterised most "primal" cultures since time immemorial, and, in fact, obtained in many indigenous groups until the industrial revolution and after. Some cultures still hold this view today. As such, the eco-centric narrative is not alien to humans, and may be seen as the normative ethos in human evolution. Grey's view represents the reformist discourse that deep ecology has rejected from the beginning.

=== Misanthropy ===
Social ecologist Murray Bookchin interpreted deep ecology as being misanthropic, due in part to the characterization of humanity by David Foreman, of the environmental advocacy group Earth First!, as a "pathological infestation on the Earth". Bookchin mentions that some, like Foreman, defend misanthropic measures such as organising the rapid genocide of most of humanity. In response, deep ecologists have argued that Foreman's statement clashes with the core narrative of deep ecology, the first tenet of which stresses the intrinsic value of both nonhuman and human life. Arne Næss suggested both a slow decrease in human population over an extended period and immigration restrictionism, not genocide.

Bookchin's second major criticism is that deep ecology fails to link environmental crises with authoritarianism and hierarchy. He suggests that deep ecologists fail to recognise the potential for humans to solve environmental issues. In response, deep ecologists have argued that industrial civilization, with its class hierarchy, is the sole source of the ecological crisis. The eco-centric worldview precludes any acceptance of social class or authority based on social status. Deep ecologists believe that since ecological problems are created by industrial civilization, the only solution is the deconstruction of the culture itself.

=== Sciencism ===
Daniel Botkin concludes that although deep ecology challenges the assumptions of western philosophy, and should be taken seriously, it derives from a misunderstanding of scientific information and conclusions based on this misunderstanding, which are in turn used as justification for its ideology. It begins with an ideology and is political and social in focus. Botkin has also criticized Næss's assertion that all species are morally equal and his disparaging description of pioneering species. Deep ecologists counter this criticism by asserting that a concern with political and social values is primary, since the destruction of natural diversity stems directly from the social structure of civilization, and cannot be halted by reforms within the system. They also cite the work of environmentalists and activists such as Rachel Carson, Aldo Leopold, John Livingston, and others as being influential, and are occasionally critical of the way the science of ecology has been misused.

=== Utopianism ===
Eco-critic Jonathan Bate has called deep ecologists utopians, pointing out that "utopia" actually means "nowhere" and quoting Rousseau's claim that "the state of nature no longer exists and perhaps never did and probably never will." Bate asks how a planet crowded with cities

could possibly be returned to the state of nature? And ...who would want to return it there? ... Life in the state of nature, Thomas Hobbes reminded readers of Leviathan in 1650, is solitary, poor, ignorant, brutish and short. It may be necessary to critique the values of the Enlightenment, but to reject enlightenment altogether would be to reject justice, political liberty and altruism.

Bates's criticism rests partly on the idea that industrial civilization and the technics it depends on are themselves "natural" because they are made by humans. Deep ecologists have indicated that the concept of technics being "natural" and therefore "morally neutral" is a delusion of industrial civilization: there can be nothing "neutral" about nuclear weapons, for instance, whose sole purpose is large-scale destruction. Historian Lewis Mumford divides technology into "democratic" and "authoritarian" technics ("technics" includes both technical and cultural aspects of technology). While democratic technics, available to small communities, may be neutral, authoritarian technics, available only to large-scale, hierarchical, authoritarian societies, are not. Such technics are unsustainable, and need to be abandoned, as supported by point #6 of the deep ecology platform.

With reference to the degree to which landscapes are natural, Peter Wohlleben draws a temporal line (roughly equivalent to the development of Mumford's "authoritarian" technics) at the agricultural revolution, about 8000 BC, when "selective farming practices began to change species." This is also the time when the landscape began to be intentionally transformed into an ecosystem completely devoted to meeting human needs.

== Links with other philosophies ==
Peter Singer critiques anthropocentrism and advocates for animals to be given rights. However, Singer has disagreed with deep ecology's belief in the intrinsic value of nature separate from questions of suffering. Michael E. Zimmerman groups deep ecology with feminism and civil rights movements. Nelson contrasts it with ecofeminism. The links with animal rights are perhaps the strongest, as "proponents of such ideas argue that 'all life has intrinsic value'".

David Foreman, the co-founder of the radical direct-action movement Earth First!, has said he is an advocate for deep ecology. At one point, Arne Næss also engaged in direct action when he chained himself to rocks in front of Mardalsfossen, a waterfall in a Norwegian fjord, in a successful protest against the building of a dam.

Some have linked the movement to green anarchism.

Further, the movement is related to cosmopolitan localism that has been proposed as a structural framework to organize production by prioritising socio-ecological well-being over corporate profits, over-production and excess consumption.

The object-oriented ontologist Timothy Morton has explored similar ideas in the books Ecology without Nature: Rethinking Environmental Aesthetics (2009) and Dark Ecology: For a Logic of Future Coexistence (2016).

== See also ==
- Anarcho-primitivism
- Biocentrism (ethics)
- Biophilia hypothesis
- Coupled human-environment system
- Earth liberation
- Ecocentrism
- Ecological civilization
- Eco-socialism
- Ecosophy
- Gaianism
- Hierarchy theory
- Human rights
- Intrinsic value (animal ethics)
- Negative population growth
- OpenAirPhilosophy
- Scale (analytical tool)
- Universal value
- Voluntary human extinction movement

== Additional sources ==
- Bender, F. L. 2003. The Culture of Extinction: Toward a Philosophy of Deep Ecology Amherst, New York: Humanity Books.
- Katz, E., A. Light, et al. 2000. Beneath the Surface: Critical Essays in the Philosophy of Deep Ecology Cambridge, Mass.: MIT Press.
- LaChapelle, D. 1992. Sacred Land, Sacred Sex: Rapture of the Deep Durango: Kivakí Press.
- Passmore, J. 1974. Man's Responsibility for Nature London: Duckworth.
- Clark, John P (2014). "What Is Living In Deep Ecology?". Trumpeter: Journal of Ecosophy. 30 (2): 157–183.
- Hawkins, Ronnie (2014). "Why Deep Ecology Had To Die". Trumpeter: Journal of Ecosophy. 30 (2): 206–273. ISSN 0832-6193.
- Drengson, Alan. "The Deep Ecology Movement." The Green Majority, CIUT 89.5 FM, University of Toronto, 6 June 2008.
