= Pseudo-Barnabas =

Anonymous religious writer

Pseudo-Barnabas usually refers to the Epistle of Barnabas and to its author, who is considered an Apostolic Father, but whom most modern scholars judge not to be St. Barnabas.

Sometimes "Pseudo-Barnabas" refers to the Gospel of Barnabas, which most scholars consider to be a late medieval work, post-1300.

The Acts of Barnabas is yet another pseudepigraphical work attributed to the name Barnabas.
