= Copropraxia =

Involuntary performance of inappropriate gestures

Copropraxia is a tic consisting of involuntarily performing obscene or forbidden gestures, or inappropriate touching. The word comes from the Greek κόπρος (kópros), meaning "feces", and πρᾶξις (prâxis), meaning "action". Copropraxia is a rare characteristic of Tourette syndrome. Related terms are coprolalia, referring to involuntary usage of profane words, and coprographia, making vulgar writings or drawings.
