= Technocentrism =

Value system centered on technology

Technocentrism is a value system that is centered on technology and its ability to control and protect the environment. Technocentrics argue that technology can address ecological problems through its problem-solving ability, efficiency, and its managerial means. Specifically, these capabilities allow humans control over nature, allowing them to correct or negotiate environmental risks or problems. Although technocentrics may accept that environmental problems exist, they do not see them as problems to be solved by a reduction in industry. Rather, environmental problems are seen as problems to be solved using rational, scientific and technological means. They also believe in scientific research. Indeed, technocentrics see the way forward for both developed and developing countries, and the solutions to environmental problems, as lying in scientific and technological advancement (sometimes referred to as sustainopreneurship).

== Origin of term ==
The term was claimed to have been coined by Seymour Papert in 1987 as a combination of techno- and egocentrism:

I coined the word technocentrism from Piaget's use of the word egocentrism. This does not imply that children are selfish, but simply means that when a child thinks, all questions are referred to the self, to the ego. Technocentrism is the fallacy of referring all questions to the technology.

However, references to technocentrism date back well before this (see, for example and).

Among the earliest references cited by O'Riordan in his book "Environmentalism" (which includes extensive discussion of ecocentric and technocentric modes of thought) is that of Hays in 1959 where technocentrism is characterised as:

The application of rational and 'value-free' scientific and managerial techniques by a professional elite, who regarded the natural environment as 'neutral stuff' from which man could profitably shape his destiny.

== Technocentrism vs ecocentrism ==
Technocentrism is often contrasted with ecocentrism. Ecocentrics, including deep ecologists, see themselves as being subject to nature, rather than in control of it. They lack faith in modern technology and the bureaucracy attached to it so they maintain responsibility for the environment. Ecocentrics will argue that the natural world should be respected for its processes and products and that low-impact technology and self-sufficiency is more desirable than technological control of nature. Fundamentally, ecocentrism maintains that concerns for the natural environment should dominate the needs of humankind, pitting it against the anthropocentric position of technocentrism, which pushes the needs of humans at the forefront even at the expense of everything else.

There are theorists who claim that despite their incompatibilities, technocentrism and ecocentrism can be integrated into one framework because they share several similarities. For instance, it is proposed that technocentrism can facilitate ecocentrism, particularly in the area of policy-making, through shared goals and shared recycled resources. There is also the case of the so-called sustaincentric worldview, which was developed as a product of ecocentric and technocentric views.

== See also ==
- Biocentrism
- Deep ecology
- Earth liberation
- Ecocentrism
- Ishmael (Quinn novel)
- Ecofeminism
- Ecological humanities
- Environmentalism
- Gaia hypothesis
- High modernism
- neo-Luddism
- Sentiocentrism
- Technogaianism
- Fordism
- High modernism
- New Frontier
- Post-scarcity economy
- Scientism
- Technological utopianism
- Techno-progressivism
- Progress
