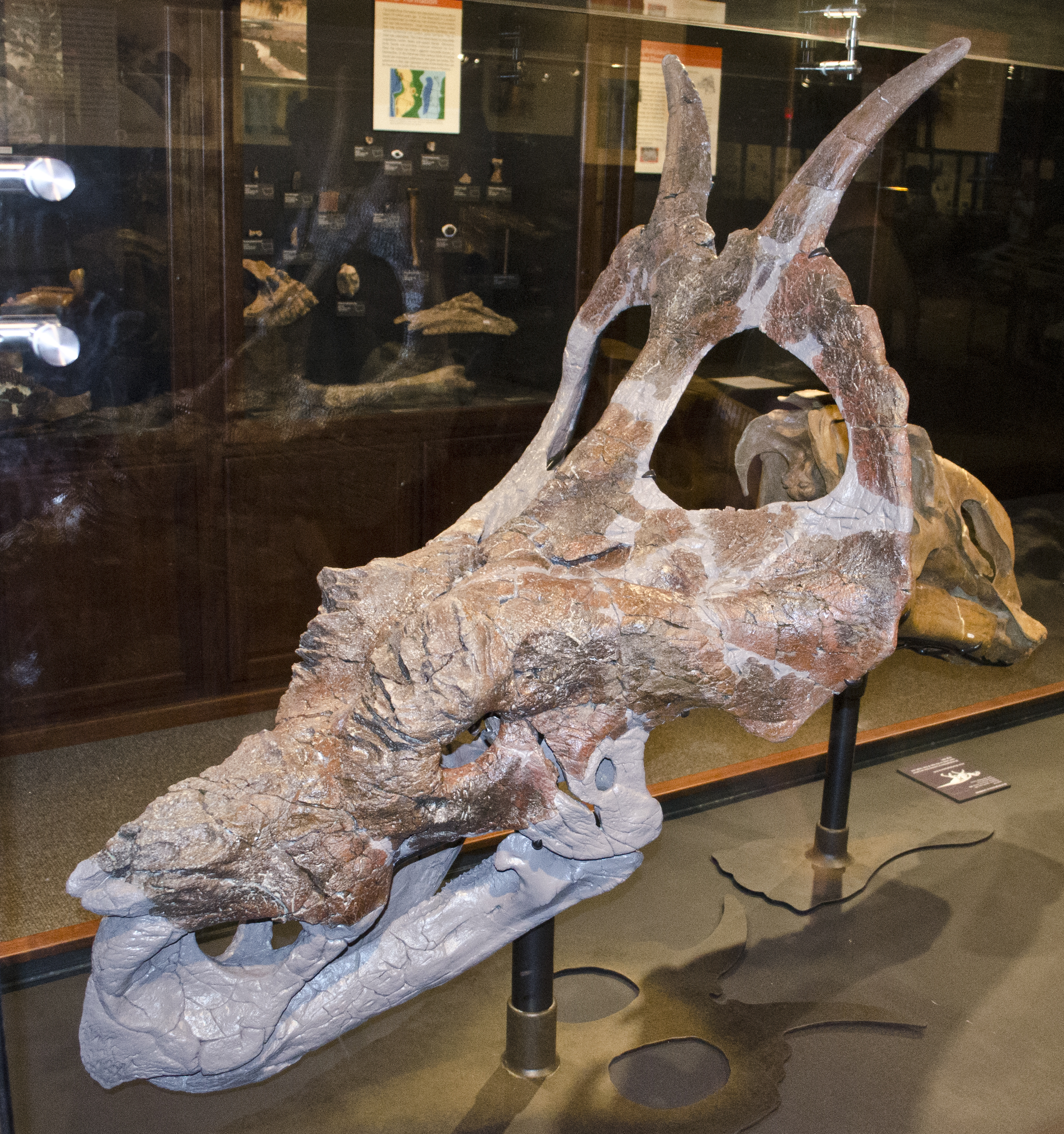
- Skull of holotype specimen MOR 485 (with reconstructed parts in blue-gray), at the Museum of the Rockies, Montana

Scientific classification
- Kingdom: Animalia
- Phylum: Chordata
- Class: Reptilia
- Clade: Dinosauria
- Clade: †Ornithischia
- Clade: †Ceratopsia
- Family: †Ceratopsidae
- Subfamily: †Centrosaurinae
- Tribe: †Pachyrhinosaurini
- Clade: †Pachyrostra
- Genus: †Achelousaurus; Sampson, 1994
- Species: †A. horneri

Binomial name
- †Achelousaurus horneri Sampson, 1994

= Achelousaurus =

Achelousaurus Temporal range: Late Cretaceous, 77–74.8 Ma

Genus of ceratopsid dinosaur from North America

Achelousaurus ( /əˌkiːloʊˈsɔːrəs, ˌækɪˌloʊəˈsɔːrəs/) is a genus of centrosaurine ceratopsid dinosaur that lived during the Late Cretaceous Period of what is now North America, about 77 to 74.8 million years ago. The first fossils of Achelousaurus were collected in Montana in 1987, by a team led by Jack Horner, with more finds made in 1989. In 1994, Achelousaurus horneri was described and named by Scott D. Sampson; the generic name means "Achelous lizard", in reference to the Greek deity Achelous, and the specific name refers to Horner. The genus is known from a few specimens consisting mainly of skull material from individuals, ranging from juveniles to adults.

A large centrosaurine, Achelousaurus supposedly was about 6 m (20 ft) long, with a weight of about 3 t (3.3 short tons). As a ceratopsian, it walked on all fours, had a short tail and a large head with a hooked beak. It had a bony neck-frill at the rear of the skull, which sported a pair of long spikes, which curved towards the outside. Adult Achelousaurus had rough bosses (roundish protuberances) above the eyes and on the snout where other centrosaurines often had horns in the same positions. These bosses were covered by a thick layer of keratin, but their exact shape in life is uncertain. Some researchers hypothesize that the bosses were used in fights, with the animals butting each other's heads, as well as for display.

Within the Ceratopsia, Achelousaurus lies within the clade Pachyrostra (or "thick-snouts"). It has been suggested that it was the direct descendant of the similar genus Einiosaurus (which had spikes but no bosses) and the direct ancestor of Pachyrhinosaurus (which had larger bosses). The first two genera would be transitional forms, evolving through anagenesis from Styracosaurus. There has been debate about this theory, with later discoveries showing that Achelousaurus is closely related to Pachyrhinosaurus in the group Pachyrhinosaurini. Achelousaurus is known from the Two Medicine Formation and lived in the island continent of Laramidia. As a ceratopsian, Achelousaurus would have been a herbivore and it appears to have had a high metabolic rate, though lower than that of modern mammals and birds.

== History of discovery ==
=== Horner's expeditions to Landslide Butte ===
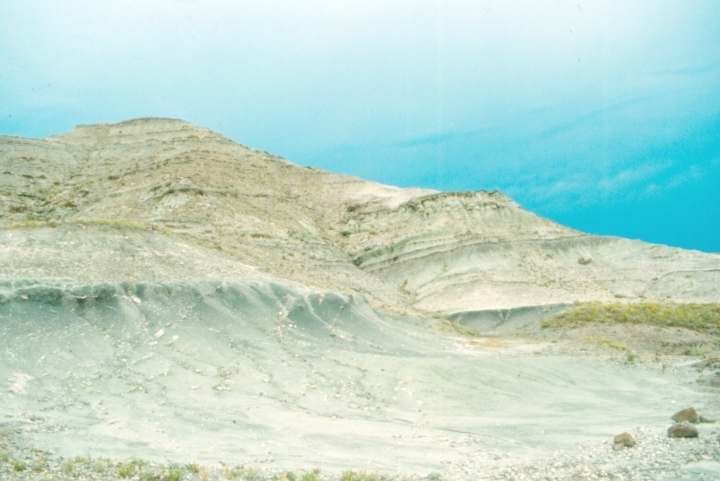
Outcrop of the Two Medicine Formation in Montana

All known Achelousaurus specimens were recovered from the Two Medicine Formation in Glacier County, Montana during excavations conducted by the Museum of the Rockies, which still houses the specimens. The discoveries came about by an accidental chain of events. In the spring of 1985, paleontologist John "Jack" R. Horner was informed that he would no longer be allowed to exploit the Willow Creek site, where he had studied the Maiasaura Egg Mountain nesting colony for six years. Having already made extensive arrangements for a new field season, he was suddenly forced to seek an alternative site. Horner had always been intrigued by the field diaries of Charles Whitney Gilmore who had reported the discovery of dinosaur eggs at Landslide Butte in 1928, but never published on them. In this locality, Gilmore had employed George Fryer Sternberg to excavate skeletons of the horned dinosaurs Brachyceratops and Styracosaurus ovatus.

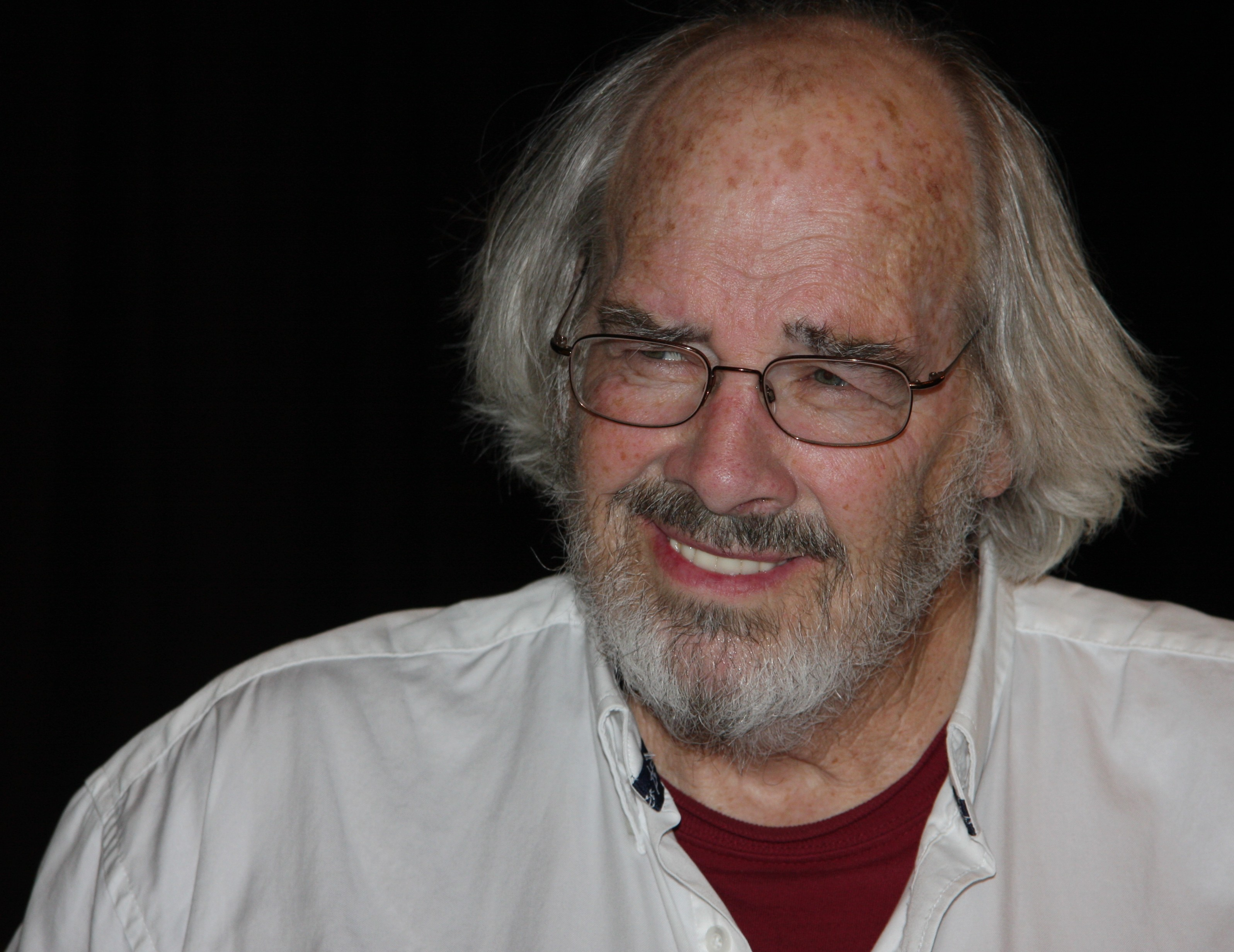
Jack Horner led the team that discovered Achelousaurus. A. horneri was named after him

That summer, Horner obtained the permission of the Blackfeet Indian Tribal Council to prospect for fossils on Landslide Butte, which is part of the Blackfeet Indian Reservation; it was the first paleontological investigation there since the 1920s. In August 1985, Horner's associate Bob Makela discovered a rich fossil site on the land of the farmer Ricky Reagan, which was called the Dinosaur Ridge Quarry and contained fossils of horned dinosaurs. On 20 June 1986, Horner and Makela returned to the Blackfeet Indian Reservation and resumed work on the Dinosaur Ridge Quarry, which proved to contain, apart from eggs, more than a dozen skeletons of a horned dinosaur later named Einiosaurus. In August 1986, at a nearby site – the Canyon Bone Bed on the land of Gloria Sundquist, east of the Milk River – Horner's team discovered another Einiosaurus bone bed. Part of the discoveries made on this occasion was an additional horned dinosaur skull, specimen MOR 492, that later would be referred to (i.e., formally assigned to) Rubeosaurus, the genus name in 2010 given to Styracosaurus ovatus.

During the field season of 1987 (early July), volunteer Sidney M. Hostetter located another horned dinosaur skull near the Canyon Bone Bed, specimen MOR 485. By the end of August, it had been secured and was driven on a grain truck to the Museum of the Rockies in Bozeman. On 23 June 1988, another site was discovered in the vicinity – the Blacktail Creek North. In the summer of 1989, graduate student Scott D. Sampson joined the team, wanting to study the function of the frill display structures in horned dinosaurs. At the end of June 1989, Horner, his son Jason and his head preparator Carrie Ancell discovered horned dinosaur specimen MOR 591, a subadult skull and partial postcranial skeleton, near the Blacktail Creek.

=== Interpretation of the collected fossils ===
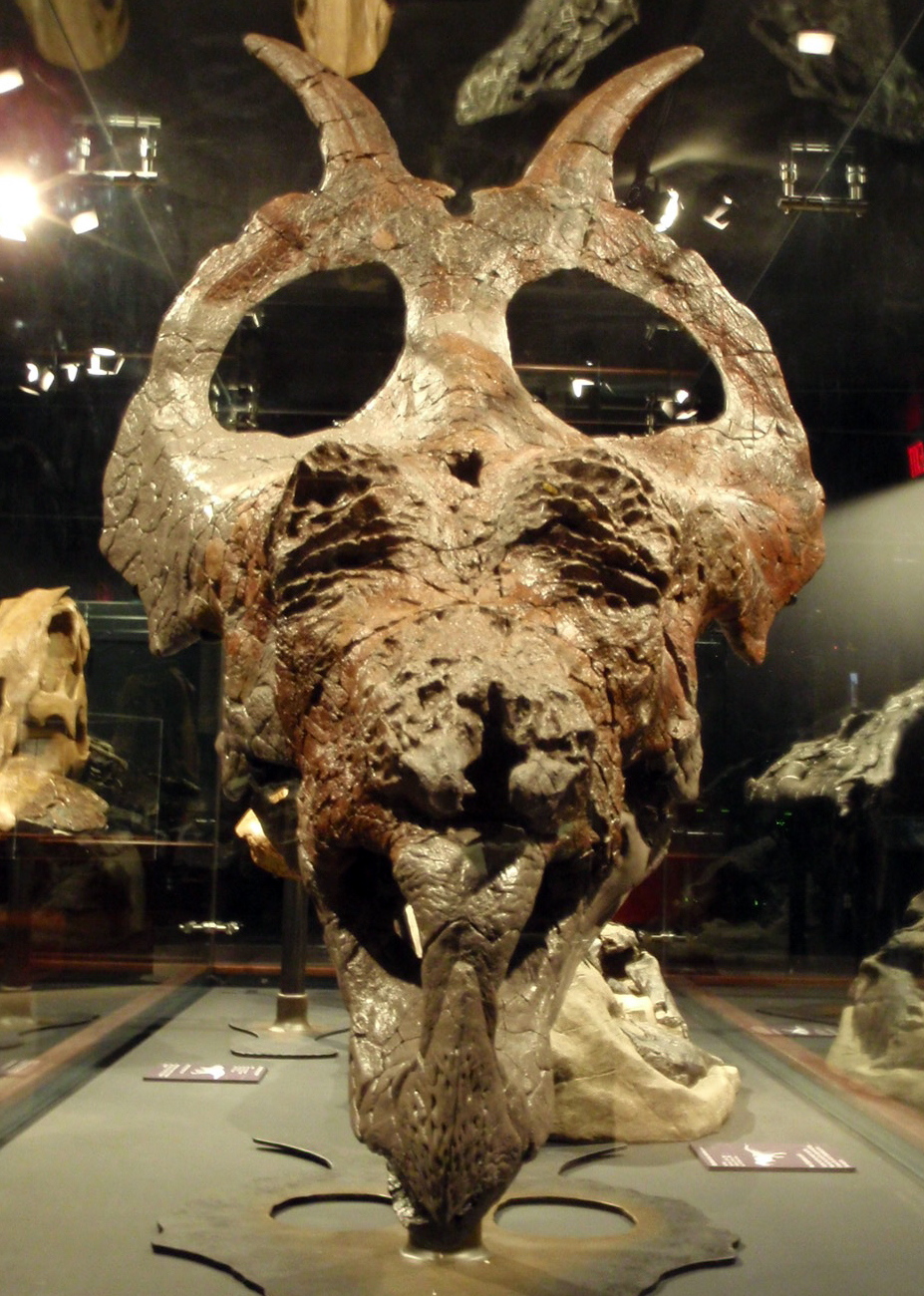
Holotype skull MOR 485 in front view

It was initially assumed that all the horned dinosaur material recovered by the expeditions could be assigned to a single "styracosaur" species distinct from Styracosaurus albertensis, as the fossils represented a limited geological time period, then estimated at half a million years. Raymond Robert Rogers, who was studying the stratigraphy of the bone beds, referred to it as a Styracosaurus sp. (of undetermined species) in 1989. Styracosaurus ovatus – though sometimes considered an invalid nomen dubium – had already been found in the area by G. F. Sternberg and was an obvious candidate. But also the possibility was taken into account that the finds were of a species new to science. This species was informally named "Styracosaurus makeli" in honor of Bob Makela, who had died in a traffic accident just days before the discovery of specimen MOR 485. In 1990, this name, as an invalid nomen nudum, appeared in a photo caption in a book by Stephen Czerkas.

Horner, an expert on the Hadrosauridae family, had less affinity for other kinds of dinosaurs. In 1987 and 1989, horned dinosaur specialist Peter Dodson was invited to investigate the new ceratopsian finds. In 1990, the fossil material was seen by Dodson as strengthening the case for the validity of a separate Styracosaurus ovatus, to be distinguished from Styracosaurus albertensis.

Meanwhile, Horner had come to a more complex view of the situation. He still thought that the fossil material had been part of a single population but concluded that this had developed over time as a chronospecies evolving into a series of subsequent taxa. In 1992, Horner, David Varricchio, and Mark Goodwin published an article in Nature based on the six-year field study of sediments and dinosaurs from Montana. They proposed that the expeditions had uncovered three "transitional taxa" spanning the gap between the already known Styracosaurus and Pachyrhinosaurus. For the moment, they declined to name these taxa. The oldest form was indicated as "Transitional Taxon A," mainly represented by skull MOR 492. Then came "Taxon B" – the many skeletons of the Dinosaur Ridge Quarry and the Canyon Bone Bed. The youngest was "Taxon C," represented by skull MOR 485 and the horned dinosaur fossils of the Blacktail Creek. In a 1997 book, Horner referred to the three taxa as "centrosaurine 1.", "centrosaurine 2." and "centrosaurine 3.".

=== Sampson names Achelousaurus ===
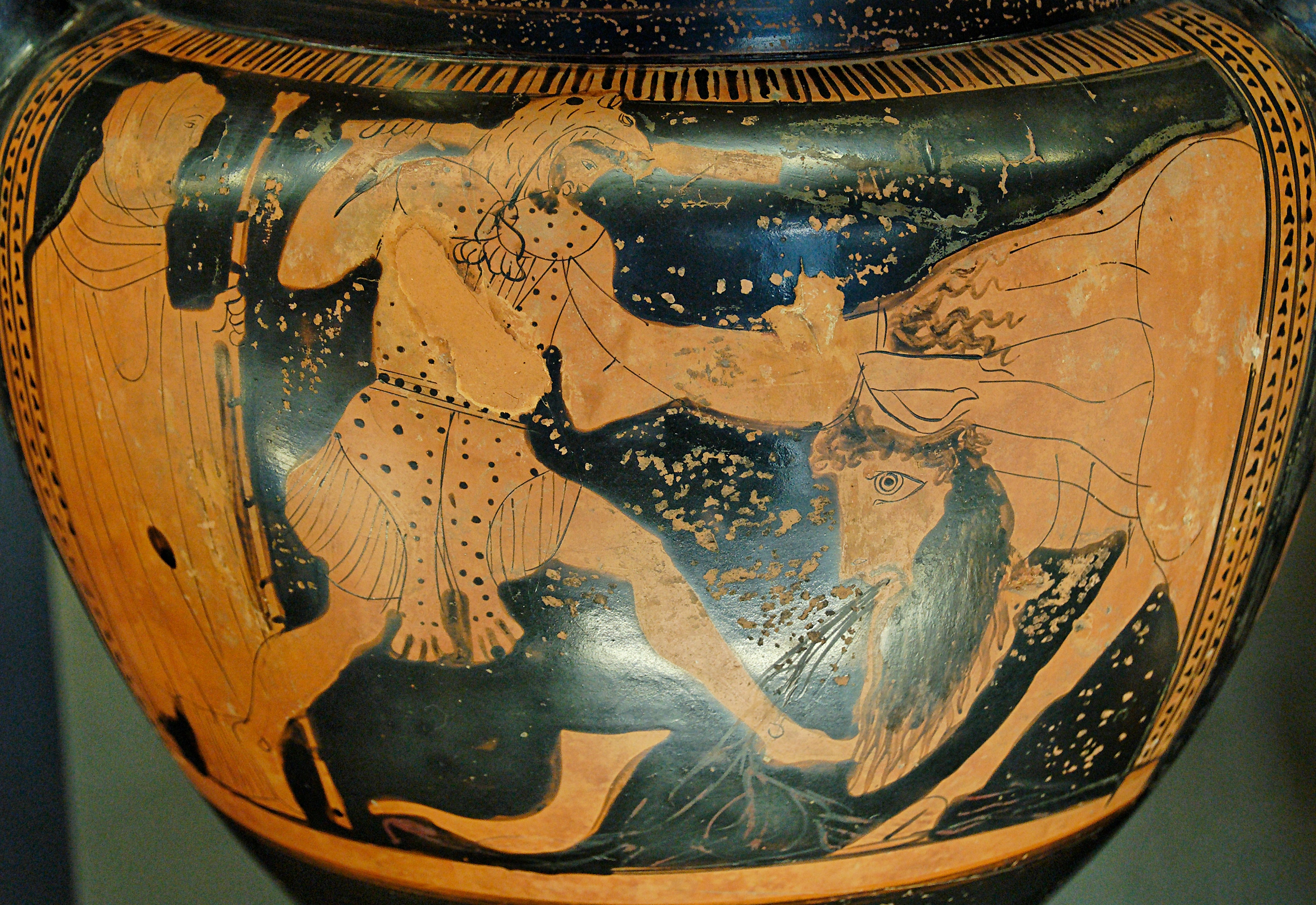
Achelous loses his horn to Hercules on an Attic krater

Sampson had continued his studies of the material since 1989. In 1994, in a talk during the annual meeting of the Society of Vertebrate Paleontology, he named "Taxon C" as a new genus and species, Achelousaurus horneri. Although an abstract was published containing a sufficient description, it did not identify a holotype, a name-bearing specimen. In 1995, in a subsequent article, Sampson indicated specimen MOR 485 as the holotype specimen of Achelousaurus horneri. The generic name consists of the words Achelous, the name of a Greek mythological figure, and saurus, which is Latinized Greek for lizard. Achelous (Ἀχελῷος) is a Greek river deity and a shapeshifter who was able to transform himself into anything. During a fight with Hercules, the mythical hero, Achelous took the form of a bull, but lost the battle when one of his horns was removed. This allusion is a reference to the supposedly transitional traits of the dinosaur and the characteristic loss of horns through ontogenetic and phylogenetic development, and thus through individual change and evolution. Dodson, in 1996, praised the generic name for being original and intelligent. The specific name honors Jack Horner, for his research on the dinosaurs of the Two Medicine Formation in Montana. Sampson also named "Taxon B" as the genus Einiosaurus in the same article wherein Achelousaurus was described. He said paleontologists needed to be cautious when naming new ceratopsian genera because their intraspecific variation (i.e., variation within a species) might be mistaken for interspecific differences (between species). Until 1995, only one new genus of centrosaurine dinosaur had been named since Pachyrhinosaurus in 1950, namely Avaceratops in 1986. Achelousaurus thus holds particular importance for being one of the few ceratopsid genera named in the late twentieth century.

The holotype specimen MOR 485 was collected by Hostetter and Ray Rogers from the Landslide Butte Field Area about 40 km (25 mi) northwest of Cut Bank. In 1995 Sampson described it as the partial skull of an adult animal including the nasal and supraorbital (region above the eye socket) bosses (roundish protuberances instead of horns), and the parietal bones. Additionally, MOR 485 preserves some bones of the skull rear and sides, which in 2009 were listed by Tracy L. Ford as a right squamosal bone, the left squamosal, both maxillae, both lacrimal bones, both quadrate bones, both palatine bones, the braincase and the basioccipital bone. In 2015, Leonardo Maiorino reported that as part of the same specimen a fragmentary lower jaw has been catalogued as MOR 485-7-12-87-4. A right squamosal bone from another adult individual was recovered from the same Canyon Bone Bed site as MOR 485 (and catalogued under the same number), but only reported in 2010. Two other specimens were collected on the Blacktail Creek, 35 km (22 mi) to the south of Cut Bank and referred to Achelousaurus by Sampson in 1995. Specimen MOR 591 is a partial skull and an about 60% complete skeleton of a sub-adult specimen that includes the vertebral column, pelvis, sacrum and a femur. It also includes lower jaws, catalogued as MOR 591-7-15-89-1. Both skull and lower jaws are nearly complete, lacking only the braincase and occipital region. MOR 591 is smaller than the holotype with a skull base length of about 60 cm (24 in). Specimen MOR 571 includes a partial skull and lower jaws with associated ribs and vertebrae of an adult. The skull consists of only the parietals, and the lower jaws are limited to their upper rear bones, the surangulars and articulars. A fifth specimen is MOR 456.1, a subadult. None of the specimens were of an advanced individual age. According to Andrew McDonald and colleagues, the Achelousaurus finds represented single individuals, not bone beds.

=== Possible Achelousaurus finds ===
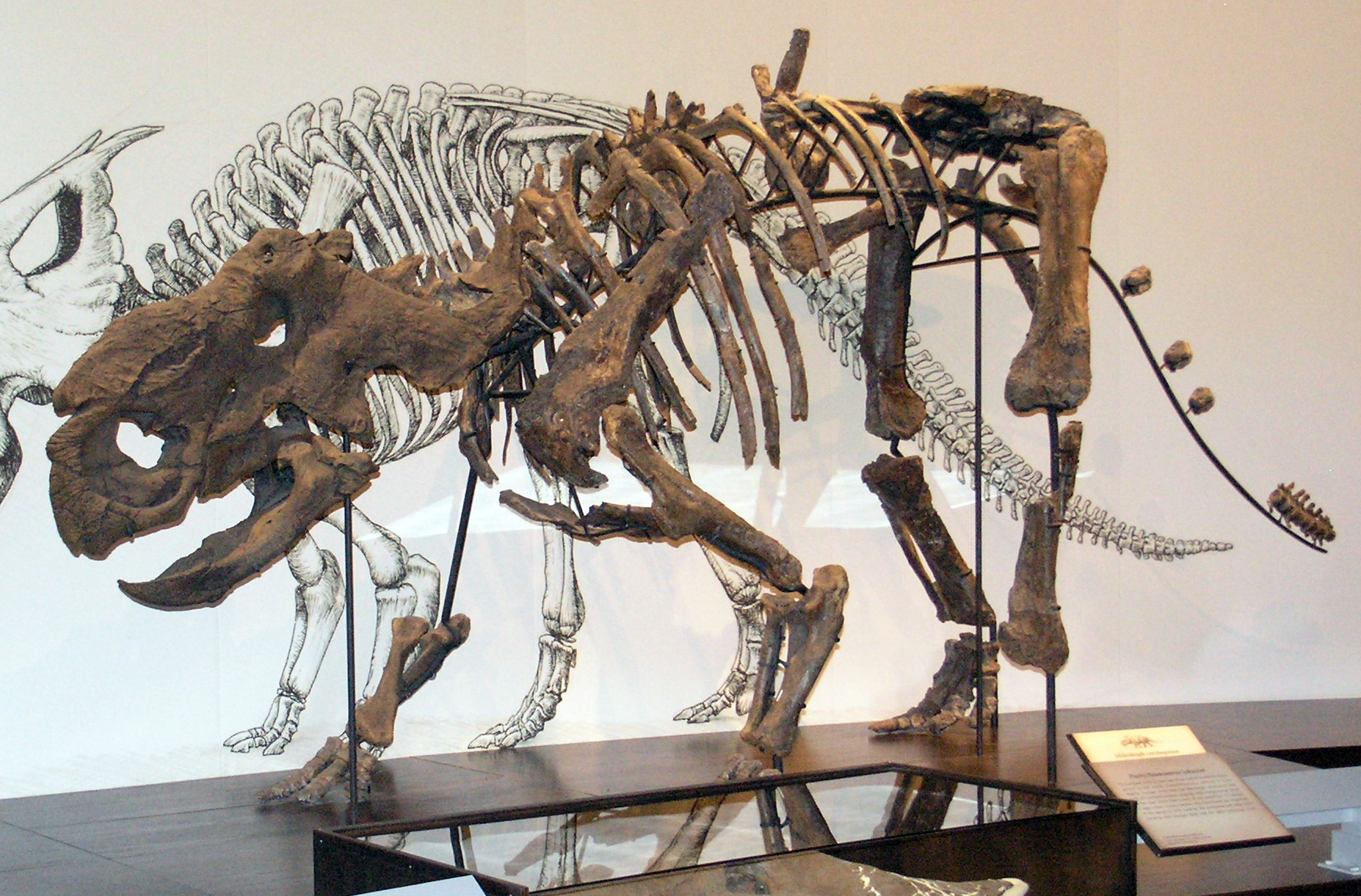
TMP 2002.76.1, which may be a specimen of Achelousaurus, Pachyrhinosaurus, or a new taxon, in the Royal Tyrrell Museum

In addition to fossils that have been unequivocally assigned to Achelousaurus, some other material has been found of which the identity is uncertain. A centrosaurine ceratopsid specimen with bosses from the Dinosaur Park Formation (specimen TMP 2002.76.1) found in 1996 was suggested to belong to a new taxon in 2006, but may instead belong to Achelousaurus or Pachyrhinosaurus. Since it is missing the parietal bones, which are used to diagnose centrosaurines, it is not possible to assign it to any genus with confidence. In 2006, it was also proposed that Monoclonius lowei, a dubious species based on a skull (specimen CMN 8790) from the Dinosaur Park Formation, could be a sub-adult specimen of Styracosaurus, Achelousaurus or Einiosaurus, with which it is roughly contemporaneous. In addition, some indeterminate specimens from the Two Medicine Formation – such as fragmentary skull MOR 464 or snout MOR 449 – may belong to Achelousaurus or the two other roughly contemporary ceratopsids Einiosaurus and Styracosaurus ovatus. The subadult specimen MOR 591 was assigned to Achelousaurus in 1995 and henceforward, but in 2021, John Wilson and Jack Scannella stated that it could also possibly belong to Einiosaurus.

== Description ==
=== General build ===
Size compared to a human

Achelousaurus is estimated to have been 6 m (20 ft) long with a weight of 3 t (3.3 short tons). The skull of an adult individual (holotype specimen MOR 485) was estimated to have been 1.62 m (5.3 ft) long. This puts it in the same size-range as other members of the Centrosaurinae subgroup of ceratopsians that lived during the Campanian age. It was about as large as its close relative Einiosaurus, but with a much heavier build. Achelousaurus approached the robustness of one of the largest and most heavily built horned dinosaurs known: Triceratops.

As a ceratopsid, Achelousaurus would have been a quadrupedal animal with hoofed digits and a shortened, downwards swept tail. Its very large head, which would have rested on a straight neck, had a hooked upper beak, very large nasal openings, and long tooth rows developed into dental batteries that contained hundreds of appressed and stacked individual teeth. In the tooth sockets, new teeth grew under the old ones, each position housing a column of teeth posed on top of each other. Achelousaurus had 25 to 28 such tooth positions in each maxilla (upper jaw bone).

=== Distinguishing traits ===
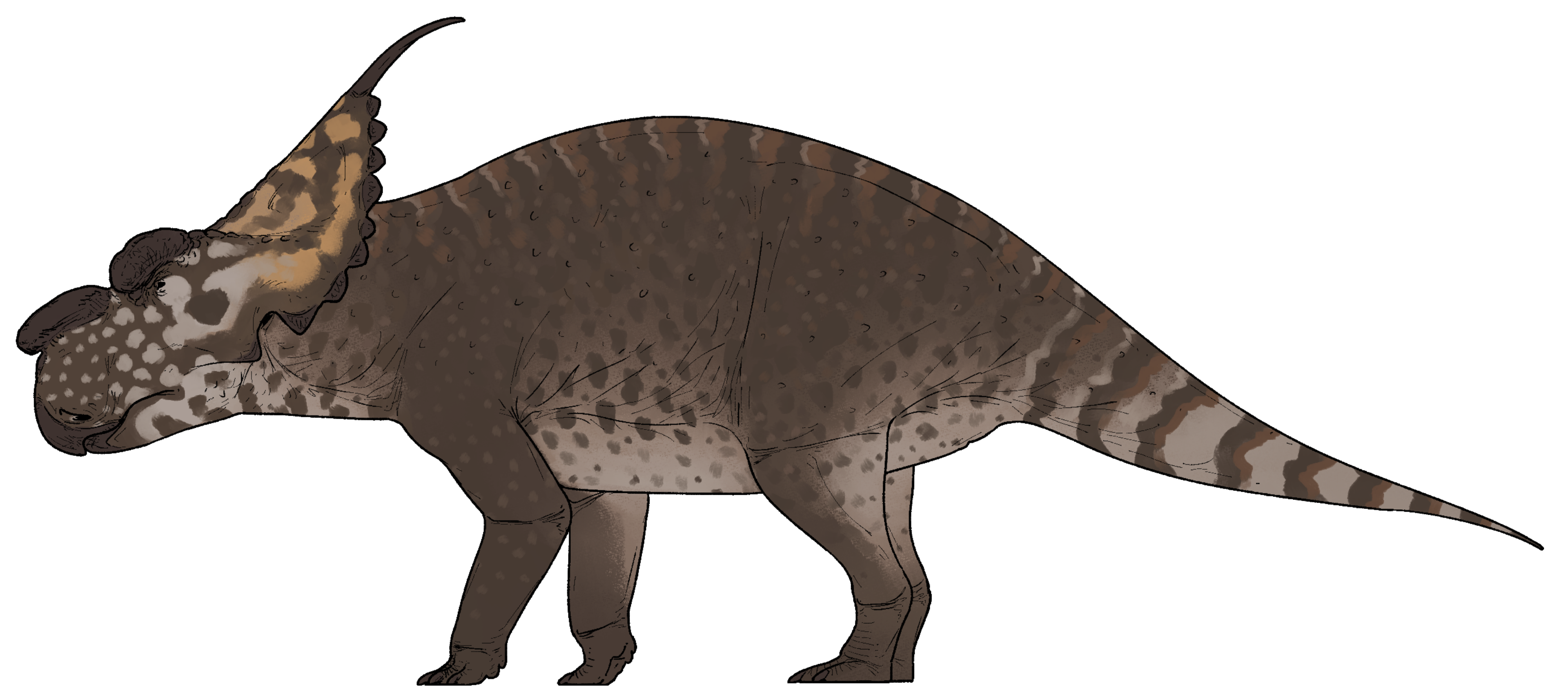
Hypothetical life restoration

In 1995, when describing the species, Sampson gave a formal list of four traits that distinguish Achelousaurus from its centrosaurine relatives. Firstly, adult individuals have nasal bones with a boss on top that is relatively small and thin, and heavily covered with pits; secondly, adult individuals do not have true horns above the eye sockets but relatively large bosses with high ridges; thirdly, not yet fully grown individuals, or subadults, have true horncores (the bony part of the horns) above the eye sockets with the inward facing surface being concave; and fourthly, the parietal bones of the neck shield have a single pair of curved spikes sticking out from the rear margin to behind and to the outside.

Besides these unique characteristics, Sampson pointed out additional differences with two very closely related forms. The frill spikes of Achelousaurus are more outwards oriented than the spikes of Einiosaurus, which are medially curved; the spikes of Achelousaurus are nevertheless less directed to the outside than the comparable spikes of Pachyrhinosaurus. Achelousaurus also differs from Pachyrhinosaurus in its smaller nasal boss that does not reach the frontal bones at its rear. Apart from the skull, no features of the skeleton are known that distinguish Achelousaurus from other members of the Centrosaurinae.

=== Skull ===
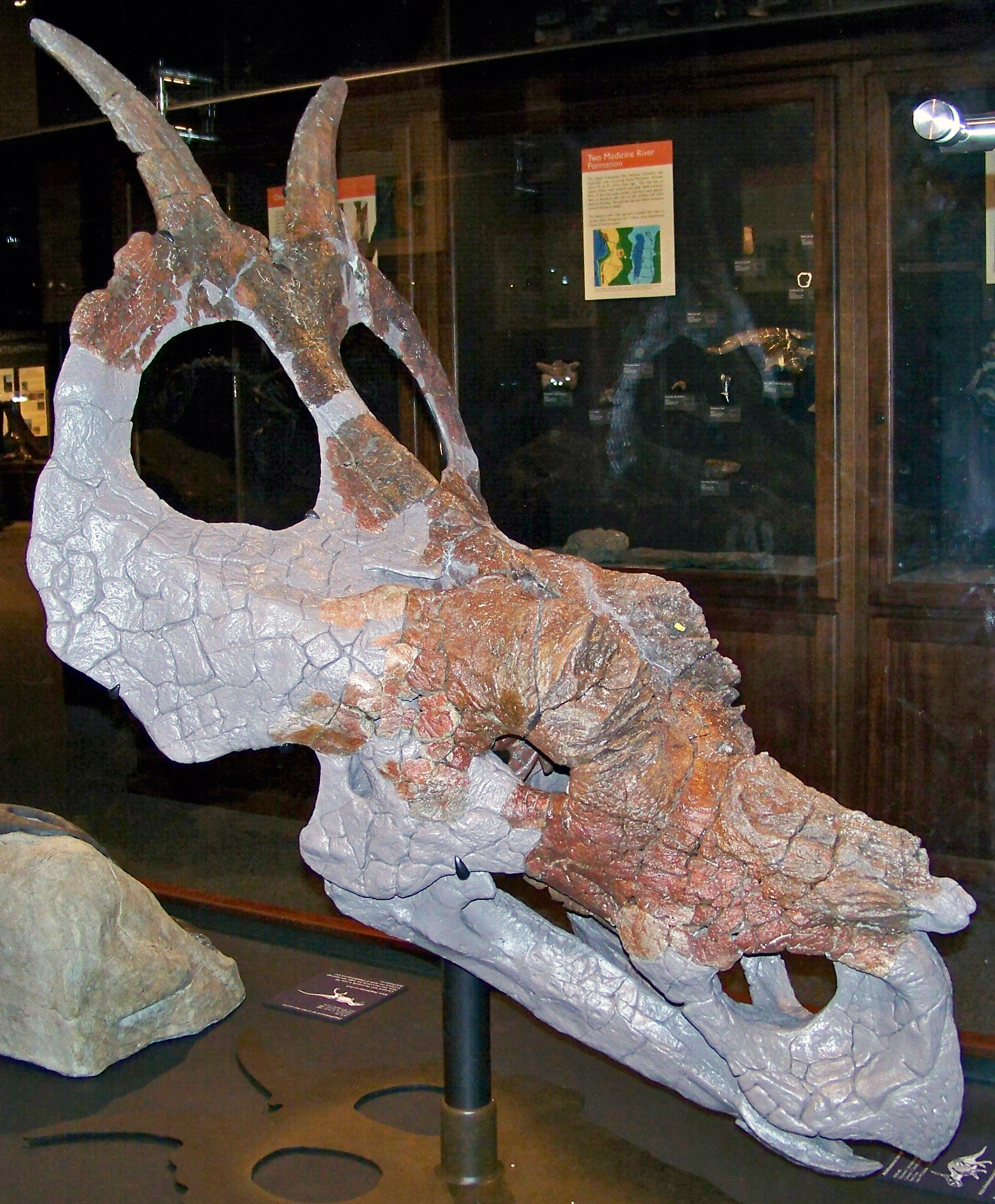
Holotype skull in right side view

Horned dinosaurs mainly differ from each other in their horns, which are located on the snout and above the eyes, and in the large skull frill, which covers the neck like a shield. Achelousaurus exhibited the build of derived ("advanced") centrosaurines, which are typified by short brow horns or bosses, combined with elaborate frill spikes. The general frill proportions are typically centrosaurine, with a wide rounded squamosal bone at the side, which expanded towards the rear. It also shares the typical frill curvature with a top surface that is convex from side to side and concave from front to rear.

Adult Achelousaurus skulls had a rugose, heavily pitted boss on the snout or nasal region, where many other ceratopsids had a horn. Such a boss is often called "pachyostotic", i.e. consisting of thickened bone. But describing it as a thick "boss" can be misleading: in fact, it forms a wide depression with a thin bone floor and irregular excavations, though it is less depressed than with Pachyrhinosaurus. The nasal boss covered about two-thirds of the top surface of the nasal bones. The boss was similar to that seen in the related genus Pachyrhinosaurus, though narrower, shorter, and less high. It covered 27% of the total skull length, was 30% longer than the nostril-eye socket distance and was about twice as long as the eye socket. Its rear edge did not reach the level of the eye socket. The nasal boss extended forward, where it fused onto the nasal and premaxilla bones (of the upper jaw) at the front of the snout, though the nasal bone itself did not fuse with the premaxilla. The boss of specimen MOR 485 furthermore had an excavation (or cavity) at its front end. The horn core that formed the boss may have developed by either becoming procurved (i.e. bent forward) during growth, like the horn of the related Einiosaurus, until it fused onto the nasal bone; or from a simple, erect horn, which later extended its base forward over the snout region, as in Pachyrhinosaurus. The nasal bone formed the top of a large bony nostril. From the rear edge of that nostril a sharp process stuck out to the front. The snout was – compared to that of Einiosaurus – relatively wide at the level of the rear nostrils. The lacrimal bone, in front of the eye socket, was thickened, mainly on the inner surface while the outer surface was featureless apart from a crater-like excavation.

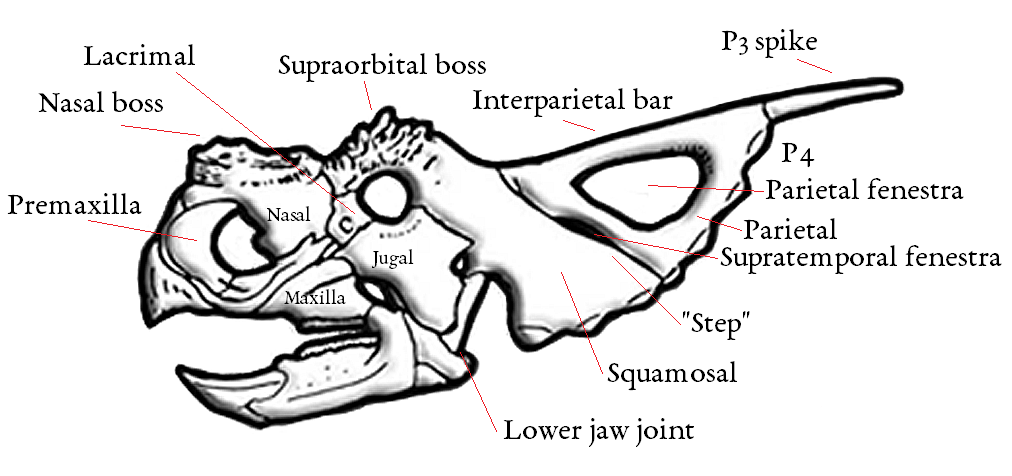
Diagram of the skull

Adult skulls also possess large, rugose, and oval bosses on the supraorbital region above the eyes, instead of the horns of other ceratopsids. The supraorbital bosses extended from the postorbital bone forward to incorporate the triangular palpebral and prefrontal bones, and had high transverse ridges around the middle, which were thick at their base and thin towards their top. The palpebral bones strongly stood out, forming an "antorbital buttress". The fused prefrontals did not reach the nasal boss, forming a distinctive transverse saddle-shaped groove separating the nasal boss from the supraorbital bosses. This groove extended backwards, separating the supraorbital bosses from each other and forming a T-shape in top view. These bosses were similar to those of Pachyrhinosaurus, but with taller ridges and more pronounced rugosities. The long and low supraorbital horncores of the sub-adult specimen MOR 591 were similar to those of sub-adult Einiosaurus and Pachyrhinosaurus. They had a concave surface on the inner side as with Pachyrhinosaurus; ridges on the postorbital bones were present that may indicate a beginning transition to bosses.

The skull roof of Achelousaurus had a midline cavity, with an opening at the top called the frontal fontanelle, a feature found in all ceratopsids, which have a "double" skull roof formed by the frontal bones folding towards each other between the brow horn bases. This cavity formed sinuses that extended below the supraorbital bosses, which were therefore relatively thin internally, being 25 mm (1 in) thick from the outside to the cavity roof. This cavity appears to have partially closed over as an animal aged, with only the rear part of the fontanelle being open in the adult specimen MOR 485.

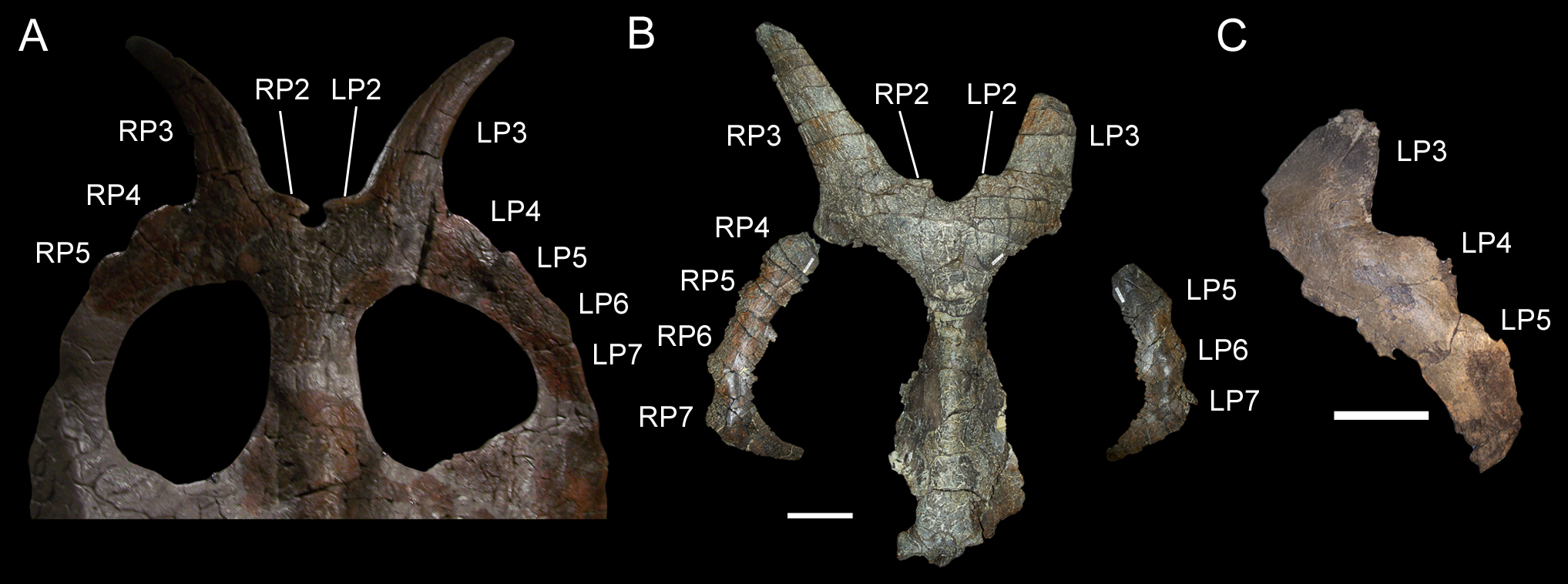
Parietosquamosal frill bones of three skulls; MOR 485, 571 and 591

Like that of all other ceratopsids, the skull of Achelousaurus had a parietosquamosal frill or "neck shield", which was formed by the parietal bones at the rear and the squamosal bones at the sides. The parietal is one of the main bones used to distinguish centrosaurine taxa from each other and resolve relationships between them, whereas the squamosal is very similar across taxa. In Achelousaurus, the squamosal bone was much shorter than the parietal. Of its inner margin the rear portion formed a step in relation to the front part, with the suture between the squamosal and the parietal showing a kink to behind at the level of the rear supratemporal fenestra, a typical centrosaurine trait. The squamosal and the jugal bone, by touching each other, excluded the quadratojugal from the edge of the lateral temporal fenestra, i.e. the opening at the rear of the skull side.

The frill of Achelousaurus had two conspicuous large spikes that were directed backwards and curved to the sides away from each other. During the 1990s, it was increasingly understood that such spikes on the parietals were not random growths but specific traits that could be used to determine the evolution of horned dinosaurs, if only it could be analyzed how they corresponded among species. Sampson, in the paper describing Achelousaurus in 1995, therefore introduced a generalized numbering system for such parietal processes, counting them from the midline to the side of the frill. This was applied to the Centrosaurinae as a whole in 1997. The large spikes of Achelousaurus correspond to "Process 3" spikes of other centrosaurines and were similar to those of Einiosaurus, though curved more to the sides, similar to Pachyrhinosaurus. They were shorter and thinner than the corresponding spikes of Styracosaurus. Between these spikes, on both sides of the central frill notch, were two small tab-like processes ("Process 2") that were directed towards the midline. Innermost "Process 1" spikes, as present in Centrosaurus, are lacking with Achelousaurus. The frill had two large paired openings, the parietal fenestrae, with a midline parietal bar between them. A linear row of rounded swellings ran along the top of the parietal bar, which may be homologous to the spikes and horns in the same area of some Pachyrhinosaurus specimens. A row of relatively small processes ran along the parietal shield margin from the "Process 3" spikes outwards, for a total per side of seven. They were largely equal in size, causing the P4 process to be reduced in comparison to the P3. These lower processes appear to have been capped by epoccipitals, bones that lined the frills of ceratopsids. In Achelousaurus these epoccipitals, which start as separate skin ossifications or osteoderms, fuse with the underlying frill bone to form spikes, at least in the third position. In 2020, it was denied that these processes were separate ossifications. In the most mature individuals, the front-most P6 and P7 processes would be less imbricated relative to each other, rotated around their longitudinal axes.

==== Keratin sheaths ====
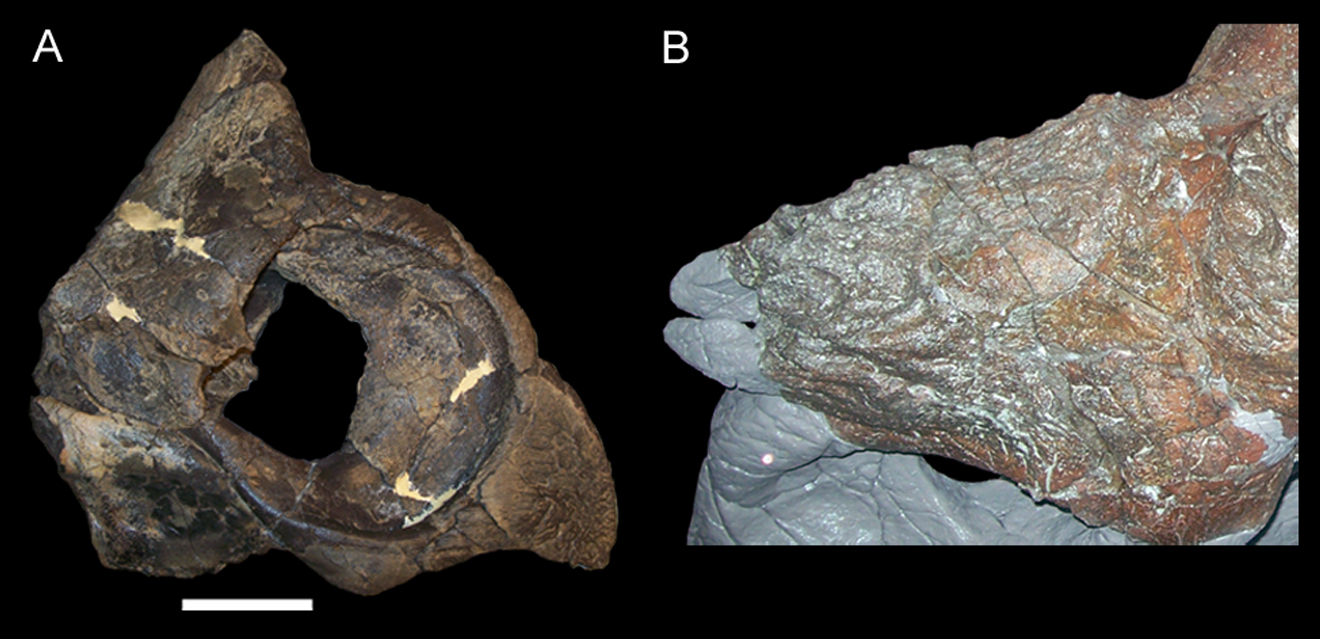
Snout regions of MOR 591 and 485

The bosses on the skull of Achelousaurus may have been covered in a keratinous sheath in life, but their shape in a living animal is uncertain. In 2009, the paleontologist Tobin L. Hieronymus and colleagues examined correlations between skull morphology, horn, and skin features of modern horned animals, and examined the skull of centrosaurine dinosaurs for the same correlates. They proposed that the rugose bosses of Achelousaurus and Pachyrhinosaurus were covered by thick pads of cornified (or keratinized) skin, similar to the boss of modern muskoxen (Ovibos moschatus). The nasal horncore of adult Achelousaurus had an upward slant and its upper surface had correlates for a thick epidermal (outer layer of skin) pad that graded into correlates for a cornified sheath on the sides. A thick pad of epidermis may have grown from the V-shaped pitted notch at the tip of the nasal horncore. The growth direction of the nasal pad would have been towards the front. The supraorbital bosses may have had a thick pad of epidermis, which grew at a sideways angle similar to the curved horncores of Coronosaurus, as indicated by the orientation of the "fins" or ridges on the bosses. That the supraorbital bosses lacked a sulcus (or furrow) at their bases indicates that their horn pads stopped at the wrinkled edges of the bosses. The pitting might indicate a softer growing layer connecting the hard inner bone with the hard horn sheath. In addition, correlates for a rostral scale in front of the nasal boss and scale rows along the parietal midline and supraorbital-squamosal region were identified.

== Evolution ==
=== Horner's hypothesis of anagenesis ===
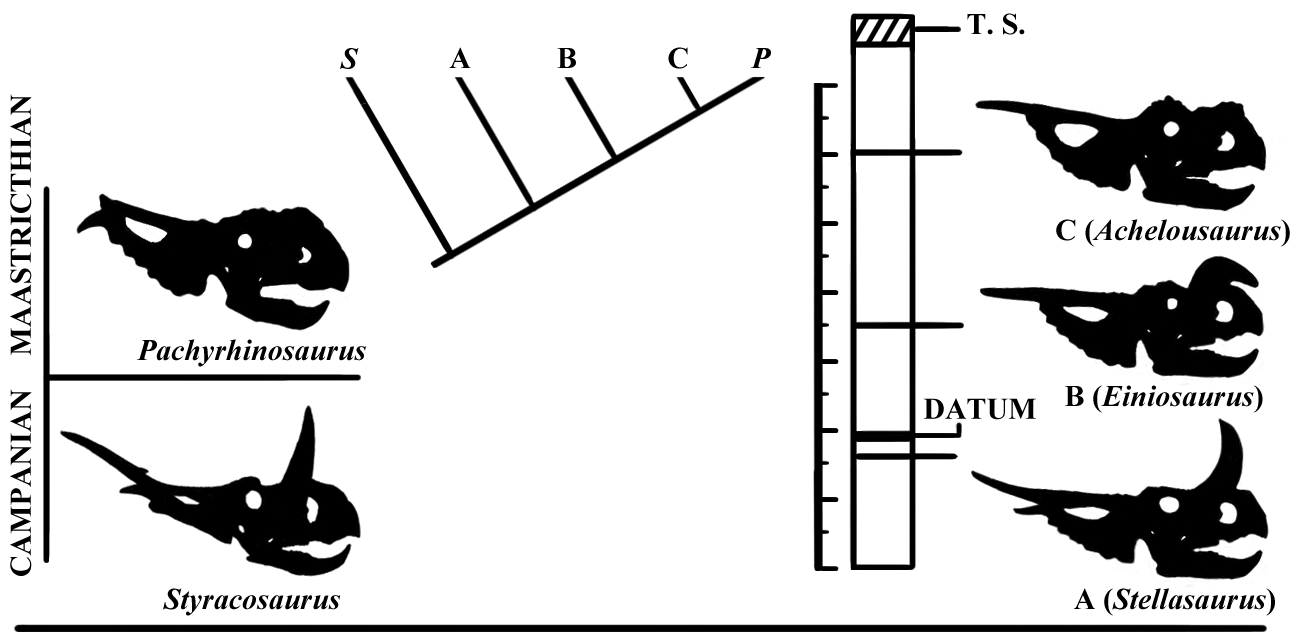
Diagram showing evolutionary lineage proposed by Horner et al., 1992

In 1992, the study by Horner et al. tried to account for the fact that within a limited geological period of time (about half a million years) there had been a quick succession of animal communities in the upper Two Medicine Formation. Normally, this would be interpreted as a series of invasions, with the new animal types replacing the old ones. But Horner noted that the newer forms often had a strong similarity to the previous types. This suggested to him that he had discovered a rare proof of evolution in action: the later fauna was basically the old one but at a more evolved stage. The various types found were not distinct species but transitional forms developed within a process of anagenesis. This conformed to the assumption, prevalent at the time, that a species should last about two to three million years. A further indication, according to Horner, was the failure to identify true autapomorphies – unique traits that prove a taxon is a separate species. The fossils instead showed a gradual change from basal (or ancestral) into more derived characters.

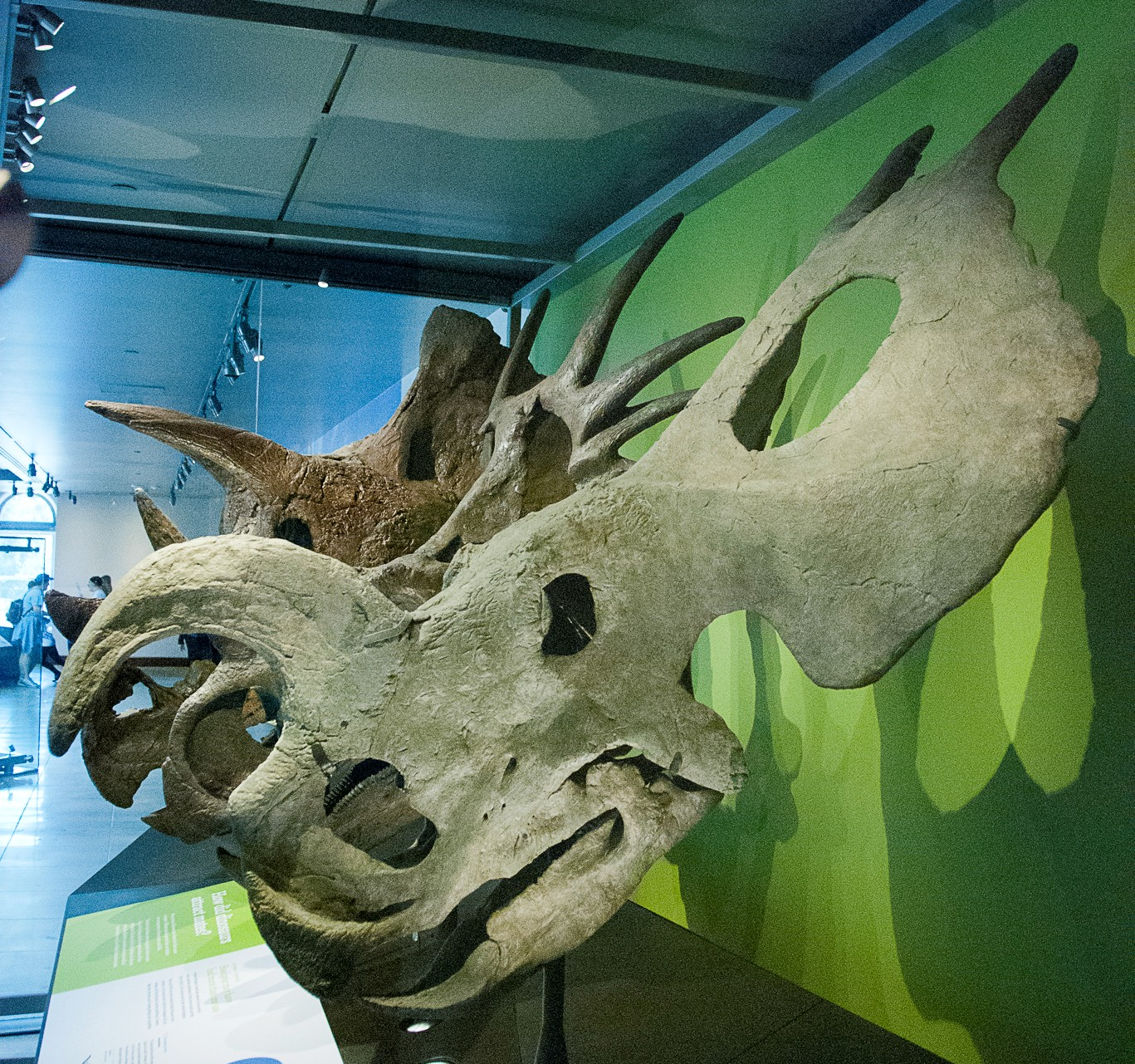
Reconstructed skull of Einiosaurus, the direct ancestor of Achelousaurus according to Horner, in the Natural History Museum of Los Angeles

The horned dinosaurs discovered by Horner exemplified this phenomenon. In the lowest layers of the Two Medicine Formation, 60 m (200 ft) below the overlaying Bearpaw Formation, "Transitional Taxon A" was present. It seemed to be identical to Styracosaurus albertensis, differing from it only in the possession of just a single pair of parietal spikes. The middle layers, 45 m (150 ft) below the Bearpaw, contained "Transitional Taxon B" that also had a single spike pair but differed in the form of its nasal horn that curved to the front over the anterior branches of the nasal bones. In the upper strata, 20 m (65 ft) below the Bearpaw, "Transitional Taxon C" had been excavated. It too had a spike pair but now the nasal horn was fused with the front branches. The upper surface of the horn was elevated and very rough. The orbital horns showed coarse ridges. Subsequently, "Taxon A" was named Stellasaurus, "Taxon B" became Einiosaurus, while "Taxon C" became Achelousaurus. In 1992, Horner et al. did not name these as species for the explicit reason that the entire evolutionary sequence was seen as representing a grade of transitional ceratopsians between Styracosaurus albertensis, known from the Judith River Formation, and the derived, hornless Pachyrhinosaurus from the Horseshoe Canyon Formation, which had the spike pair and bosses on the nose and above the eyes, as well as additional frill ornamentation.

Horner thought he had found the mechanism driving this evolution, elaborating on ideas he had developed even before he had investigated Landslide Butte. The animals were living on a narrow strip on the east-coast of Laramidia, bordering the Western Interior Seaway and constrained in the west by the 3 to 4 kilometres (2 to 2.5 mi) high proto-Rocky Mountains. During the Bearpaw Transgression sea levels were rising, steadily reducing the width of their coastal habitat from about 300 km (200 mi) to 30 km (20 mi). This led to stronger selection pressures, the severest for Achelousaurus which lived during the phase that the coastal strip was at its narrowest. The lower number of individuals that the smaller habitat could have sustained constituted a population bottleneck, making rapid evolution possible. Increased sexual selection would have induced changes in the sexual ornamentation such as spikes, horns and bosses. A reduced environmental stress by lower sea levels on the other hand, would be typified by adaptive radiation. That sexual selection had indeed been the main mechanism would be proven by the fact that young individuals of all three populations were very similar: they all had two frill spikes, a small nasal horn pointing to the front, and orbital horns in the form of slightly elevated knobs. Only in the adult phase did they begin to differ. According to Horner, this also showed that the populations were very closely related.

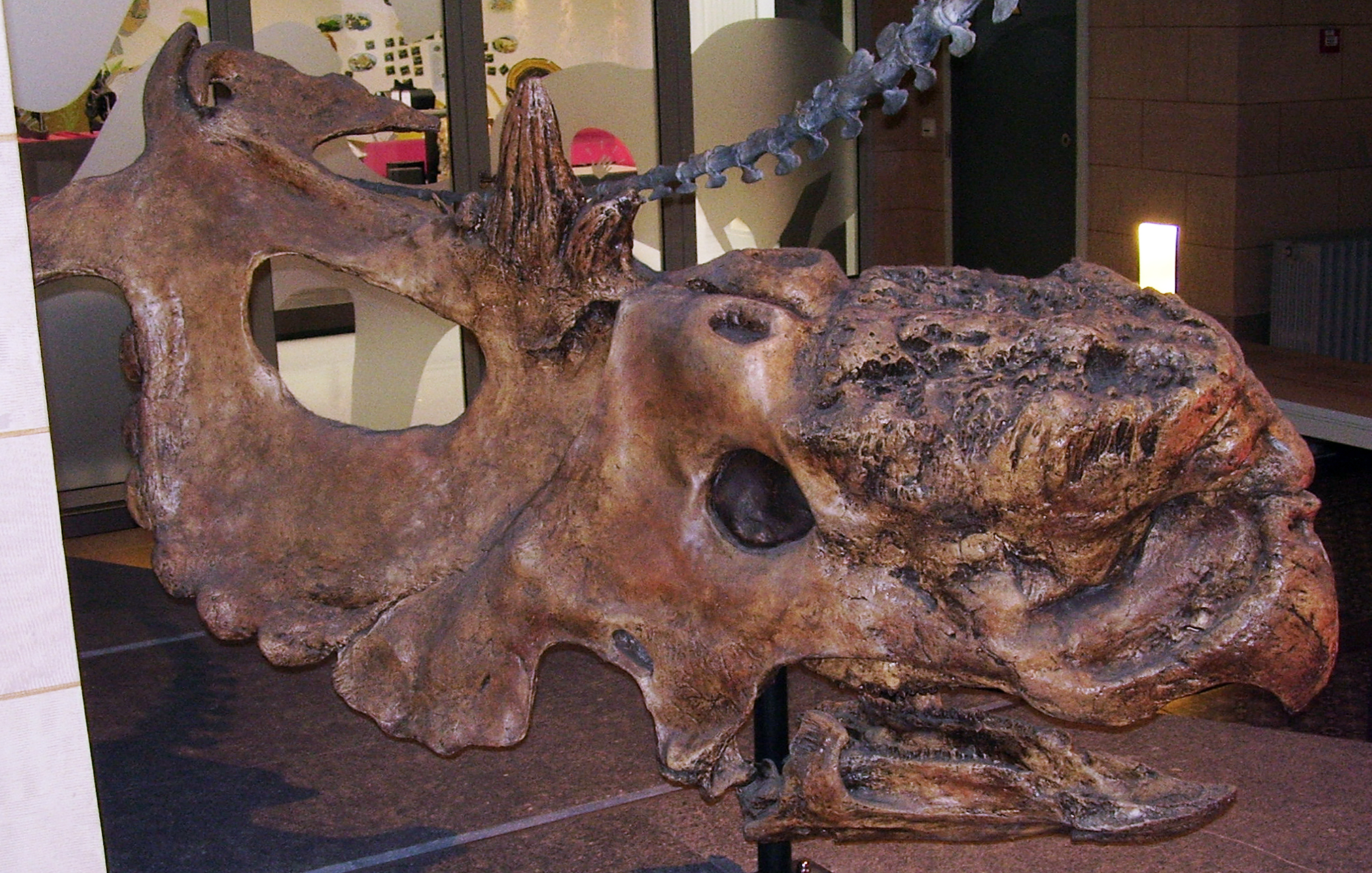
Skull cast of Pachyrhinosaurus, a descendant of Einiosaurus and Achelousaurus according to Horner, at the Museum of Natural Sciences of Belgium

Horner did not perform an exact cladistic analysis determining the relationship between the three populations. Such an analysis calculates which evolutionary tree implies the lowest number of evolutionary changes and therefore is the most likely. He assumed that this would result in a tree in which the types were successive branches. Such a tree would, as a consequence of the method used, never show a direct ancestor-descendant relationship. Many scientists believed such a relation could never be proven anyway. Horner disagreed: he saw the gradual morphological changes as clear proof that, in this case, the evolution of one taxon into another, without a splitting of the populations, could be directly observed. Evolutionists in general would be too hesitant to recognize this. Such a transition is called anagenesis; he posited that, if the opposite, cladogenesis, could not be proven, a scientist was free to assume an anagenetic process.

Basing himself on revised data, Sampson in 1995 estimated that the layers investigated represented a longer period of time than the initially assumed 500,000 years: after the deposition of Gilmore's Brachyceratops quarry, 860,000 years would have passed, and after the Einiosaurus beds 640,000 years, until the maximal extent of the Bearpaw transgression. He did not adopt Horner's hypothesis of anagenesis but assumed speciation took place, with the populations splitting. These time intervals were still short enough to indicate that the rate of speciation must have been high, which might have been true of all centrosaurines of the late Campanian.

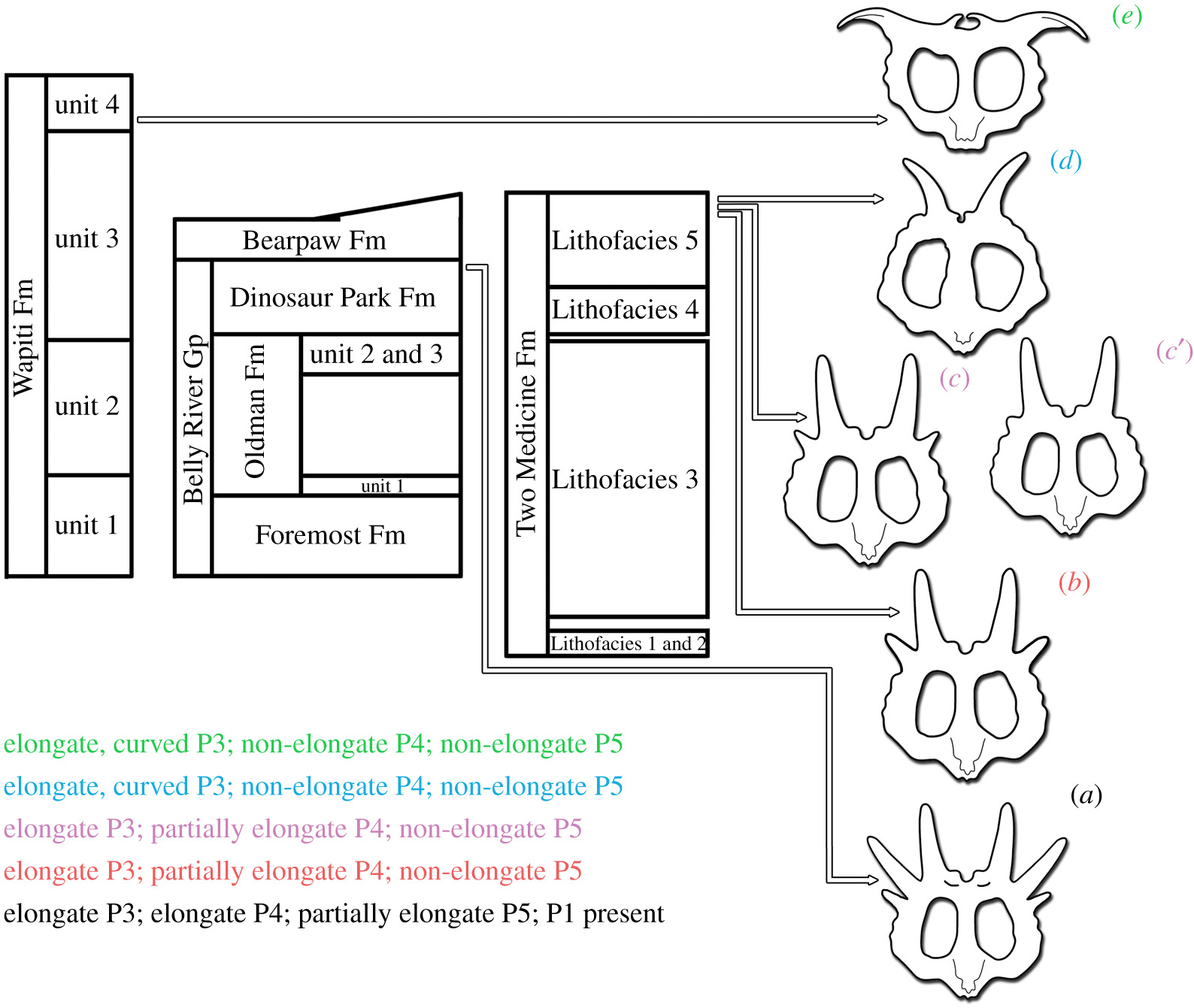
Stratigraphic and temporal relationship of taxa hypothesized as representing an anagenetic lineage by Wilson et al., 2020

In 1996, Dodson raised two objections to Horner's hypothesis. Firstly, the possession of just one pair of main spikes seemed more basal than the presence of three pairs, as with Styracosaurus albertensis. This suggested to him that the Einiosaurus–Achelousaurus lineage was a separate branch within the Centrosaurinae. Secondly, he was concerned that Einiosaurus and Achelousaurus were a case of sexual dimorphism, one type being the males, the other the females. This would be suggested by the short geological time interval between the layers their fossils had been found in, which was estimated by him at about 250,000 years. But if the hypothesis were true, it would be perhaps the best example of fast evolution in the Dinosauria.

In 2010, Horner admitted that specimen TMP 2002.76.1 seemed to indicate that Achelousaurus was not descended from Einiosaurus, as it preceded both in age, and yet had a nasal boss. But he stressed that even if the lineages split off, its ancestor might have resembled Einiosaurus. Furthermore, it might still be possible that Einiosaurus was a direct descendant of Rubeosaurus. Also, the process of rapid displacements and extinctions of species could in his opinion still be elegantly explained by a westward expansion of the Bearpaw Sea.

The process of anagenesis was affirmed by Wilson and Scannella in 2016, who studied the ontogenetic changes in horned dinosaurs. They compared a small Einiosaurus specimen, MOR 456 8-8-87-1, with Achelousaurus specimen MOR 591. Both proved to be quite similar, with the main differences being a longer face in MOR 456 8-8-87-1, and a sharper supraorbital horncore in MOR 591. They concluded that Achelousaurus was likely the direct descendant of Einiosaurus. The more adult Einiosaurus individuals approached the Achelousaurus morphology. The differences between the two taxa would have been caused by heterochrony – differential changes in the speed the various traits developed during the lifetime of an individual. Since Wilson and colleagues found in 2020 that Stellasaurus (Horner's "Taxon A") was intermediate between Styracosaurus and Einiosaurus in morphology and stratigraphy, they could not discount that it was a transitional taxon within an anagenetic lineage.

=== Classification ===
In 1995, Sampson formally placed Achelousaurus in the Ceratopsidae, more precisely the Centrosaurinae. In all analyses, Einiosaurus and Achelousaurus are part of the clade Pachyrhinosaurini. By definition, Achelousaurus is a member of the clade Pachyrostra (or "thick-snouts"), in which it is united with Pachyrhinosaurus. In 2010, Gregory S. Paul assigned A. horneri to the genus Centrosaurus, as C. horneri. This has found no acceptance among other researchers, with subsequent taxonomic assessments invariably keeping the generic name Achelousaurus.

=== Phylogeny ===
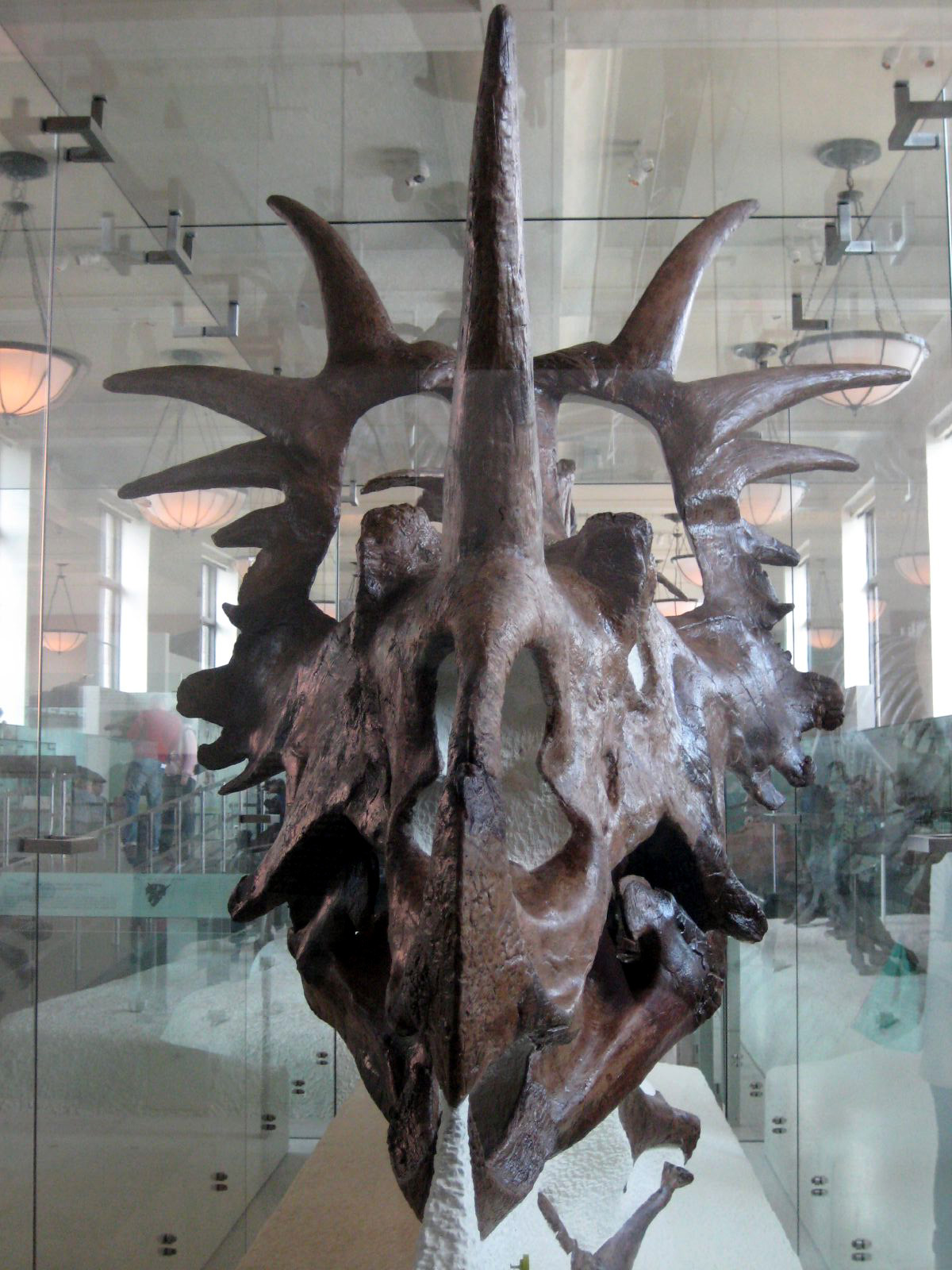
Phylogenetic analyses have varied in the closeness of the relationship between Einiosaurus, Achelousaurus, and Styracosaurus; here, a skull at the American Museum of Natural History

Sampson felt, in 1995, that there was not enough evidence to conclude that Achelousaurus was a direct descendant of Einiosaurus. Unlike Horner, he decided to perform a cladistic analysis to establish a phylogeny. This showed an evolutionary tree wherein Achelousaurus split off between Einiosaurus and Pachyrhinosaurus, as Horner had predicted. Contrary to Horner's claim, Styracosaurus albertensis could not have been a direct ancestor, as it was a sister species of Centrosaurus in Sampson's analysis.

Subsequent studies have sought to determine the precise relationships within this part of the evolutionary tree, with conflicting results regarding the question whether Styracosaurus albertensis or Einiosaurus might have been in the direct line of ascent to Achelousaurus. In 2005, an analysis by Michael Ryan and Anthony Russell found Styracosaurus more closely related to Achelousaurus than to Centrosaurus. This was confirmed by analyses by Ryan in 2007, Nicholas Longrich in 2010, and Xu et al. in 2010. The same year Horner and Andrew T. McDonald moved Styracosaurus ovatus to its own genus, Rubeosaurus, finding it a sister species of Einiosaurus, while Styracosaurus albertensis was again located on the Centrosaurus branch. They also assigned specimen MOR 492, the basis of "Taxon A", to Rubeosaurus. In 2011, a subsequent study by Andrew T. McDonald in this respect replicated the outcome of his previous one, as did a publication by Andre Farke et al. In 2017, J.P. Wilson and Ryan further complicated the issue, concluding that MOR 492 ("Taxon A") was not referable to Rubeosaurus and announcing that yet another genus would be named for it. Wilson and colleagues moved MOR 492 to the new genus Stellasaurus in 2020, which therefore corresponds to "Taxon A". Their study found Rubeosaurus ovatus to be the sister species of Styracosaurus albertensis, and concluded Rubeosaurus to be synonymous with Styracosaurus.

Before Achelousaurus was described, Pachyrhinosaurus canadensis had been considered a solitary aberrant form among centrosaurines, set apart from them by its unusual bosses. Achelousaurus gave evolutionary context to the Canadian species, while expanding the temporal and geographical range for what came to be seen as "pachyrhinosaurs." In all analyses, Achelousaurus and Pachyrhinosaurus were sister groups. In 2008, another closely related species was named, Pachyrhinosaurus lakustai. In that study, the term "Pachyrhinosaurs" was used for the clade consisting of Achelousaurus and Pachyrhinosaurus. When Pachyrhinosaurus perotorum was described in 2012, the clade name Pachyrostra was coined, uniting the two genera; Achelousaurus is the basalmost pachyrostran. Shared derived traits (or synapomorphies) of the group are an enlarged nasal ornamentation and a change of the nasal and brow horns into bosses. At the end of the Campanian, there seems to have been a trend of pachyrostrans replacing other centrosaurines. Also in 2012, the clade Pachyrhinosaurini was named, consisting of species more closely related to Pachyrhinosaurus or Achelousaurus than to Centrosaurus. Apart from Einiosaurus and Rubeosaurus, this included Sinoceratops and Xenoceratops, according to a 2013 study.

Cladistic analyses develop gradually, reflecting new discoveries and insights. Their results can be shown in a cladogram, with the relationships found ordered in an evolutionary tree. The cladogram below shows the phylogenetic position of Achelousaurus in a cladogram from Wilson and colleagues, 2020.

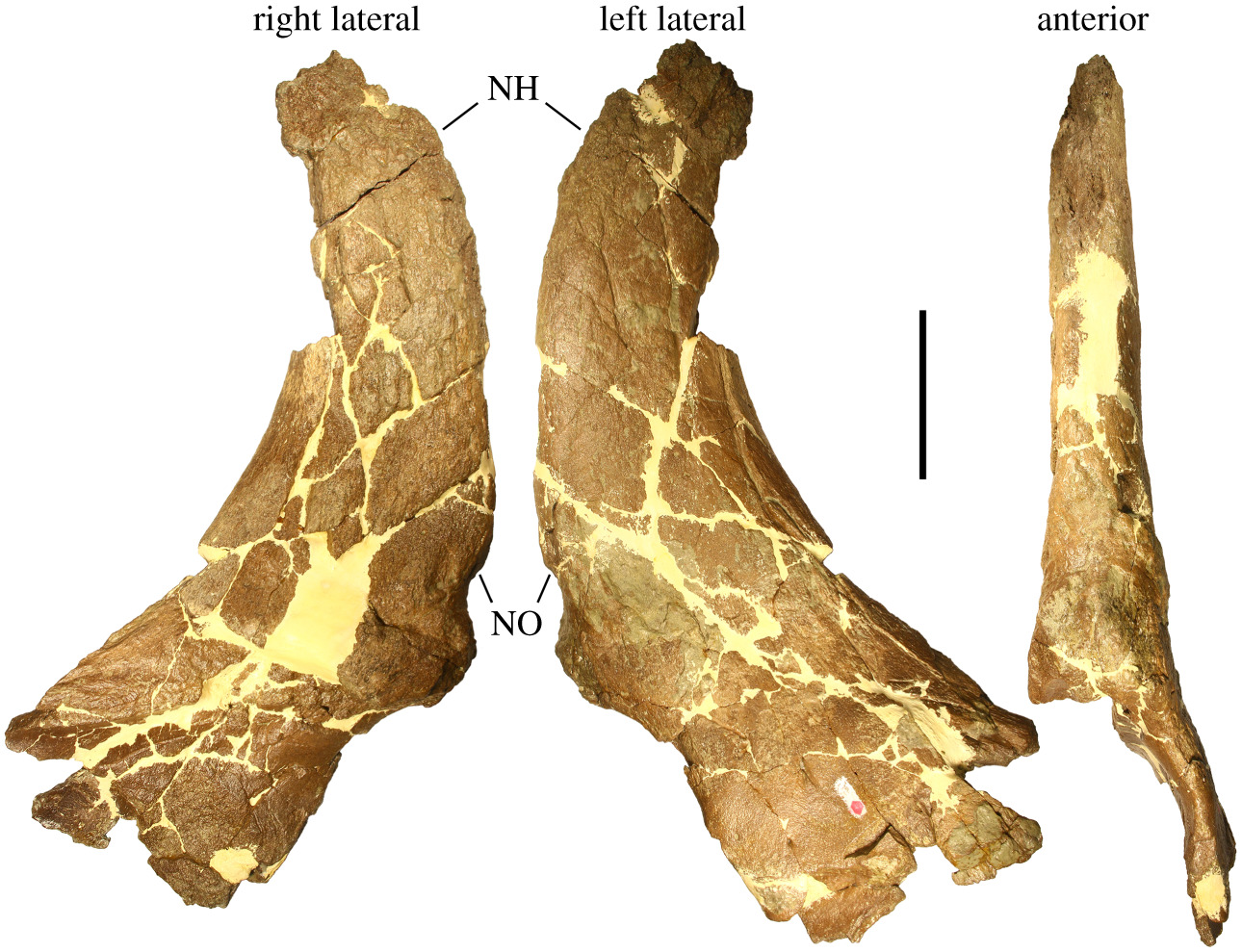
Nasal horn of Stellasaurus, the possible ancestor of Einiosaurus and Achelousaurus

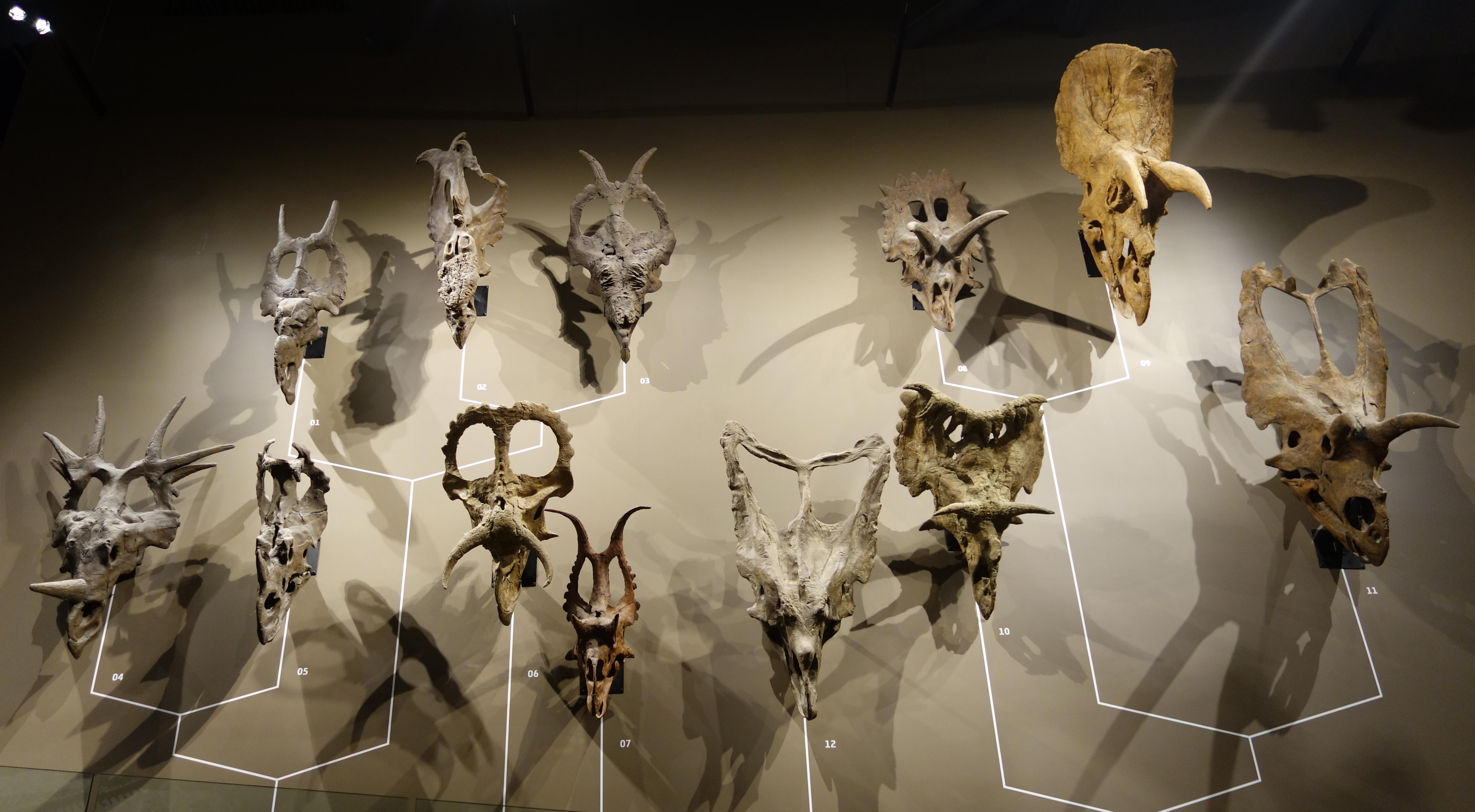
Ceratopsid skull casts positioned in a phylogenetic tree, in the Natural History Museum of Utah, with Achelousaurus (cast of MOR 485) third from the upper left row (number 03)

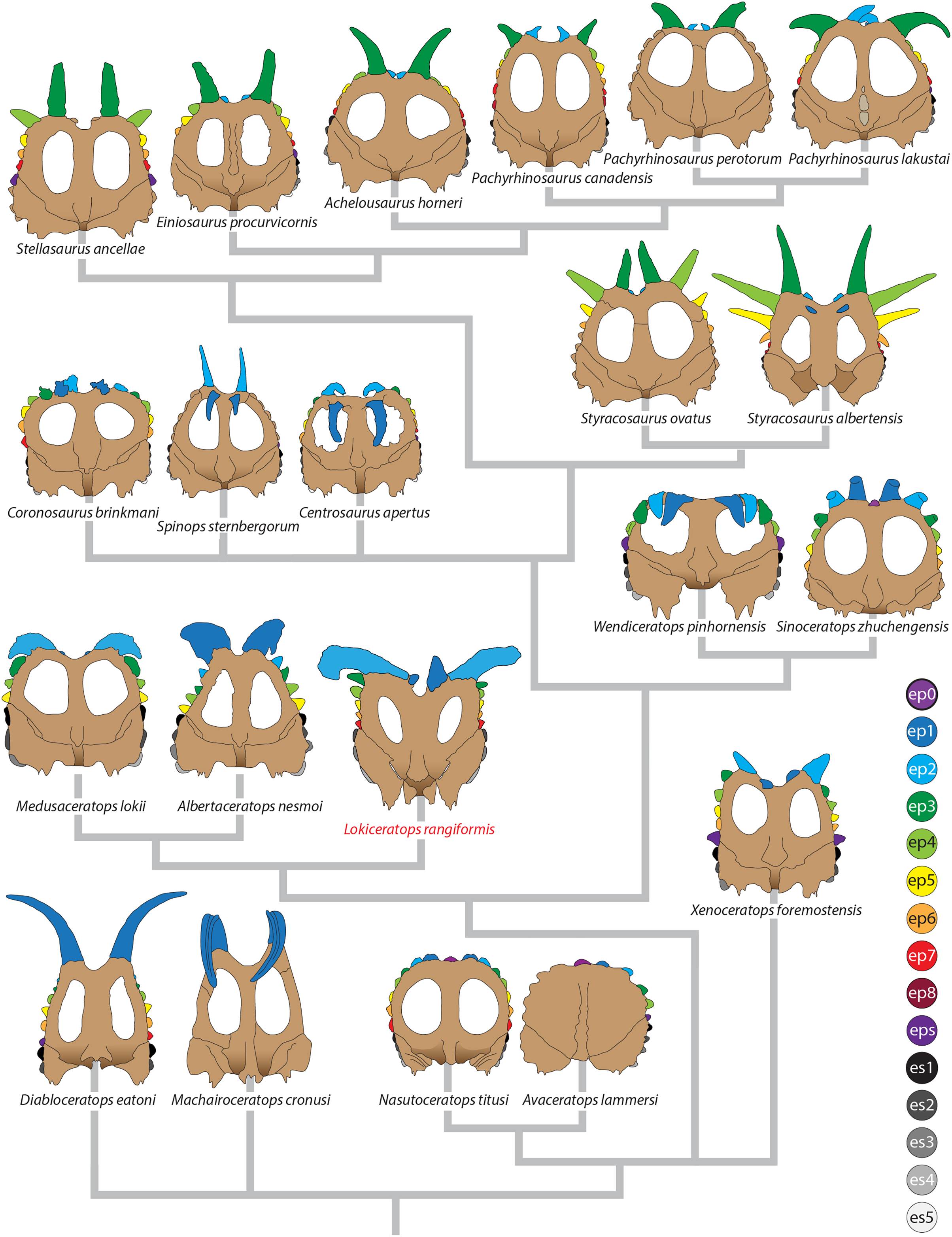
Comparison between neck-frills of centrosaurines known by 2024

- Centrosaurinae
  - - - Xenoceratops foremostensis
      - - Medusaceratops lokii
        - - Wendiceratops pinhornensis
          - Sinoceratops zhuchengensis
    - - - Machairoceratops cronusi
        - Diabloceratops eatoni
      - - Albertaceratops nesmoi
        - - Nasutoceratops titusi
          - Avaceratops lammersi
  - - - Spinops sternbergorum
      - - Centrosaurus apertus
        - Coronosaurus brinkmani
    - - - Styracosaurus ovatus
        - Styracosaurus albertensis
      - - Stellasaurus ancellae
        - - Einiosaurus procurvicornis
          - - Achelousaurus horneri
            - - Pachyrhinosaurus lakustai
              - - Pachyrhinosaurus perotorum
                - Pachyrhinosaurus canadensis

== Paleobiology ==
=== Function of skull ornamentation ===
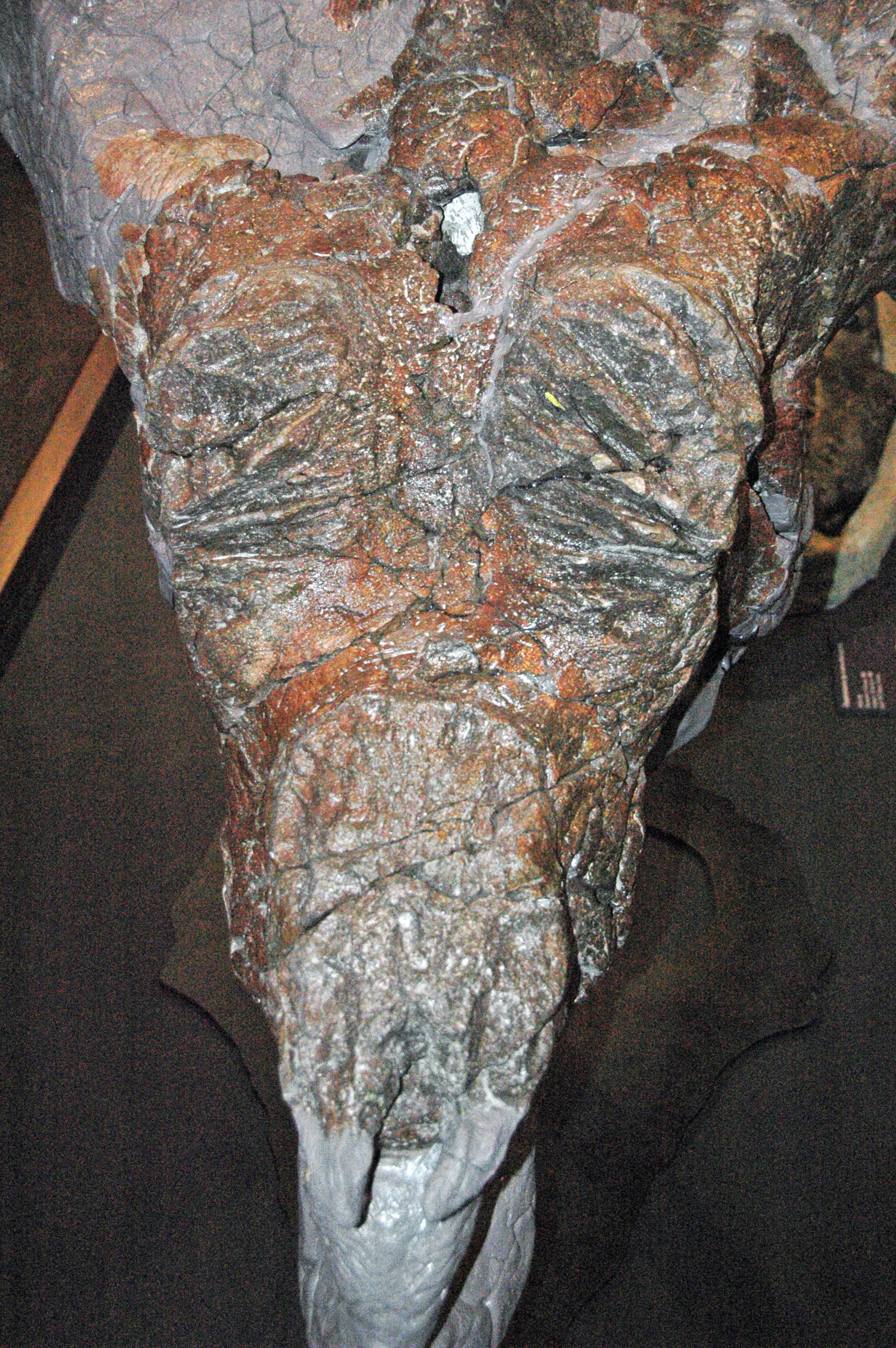
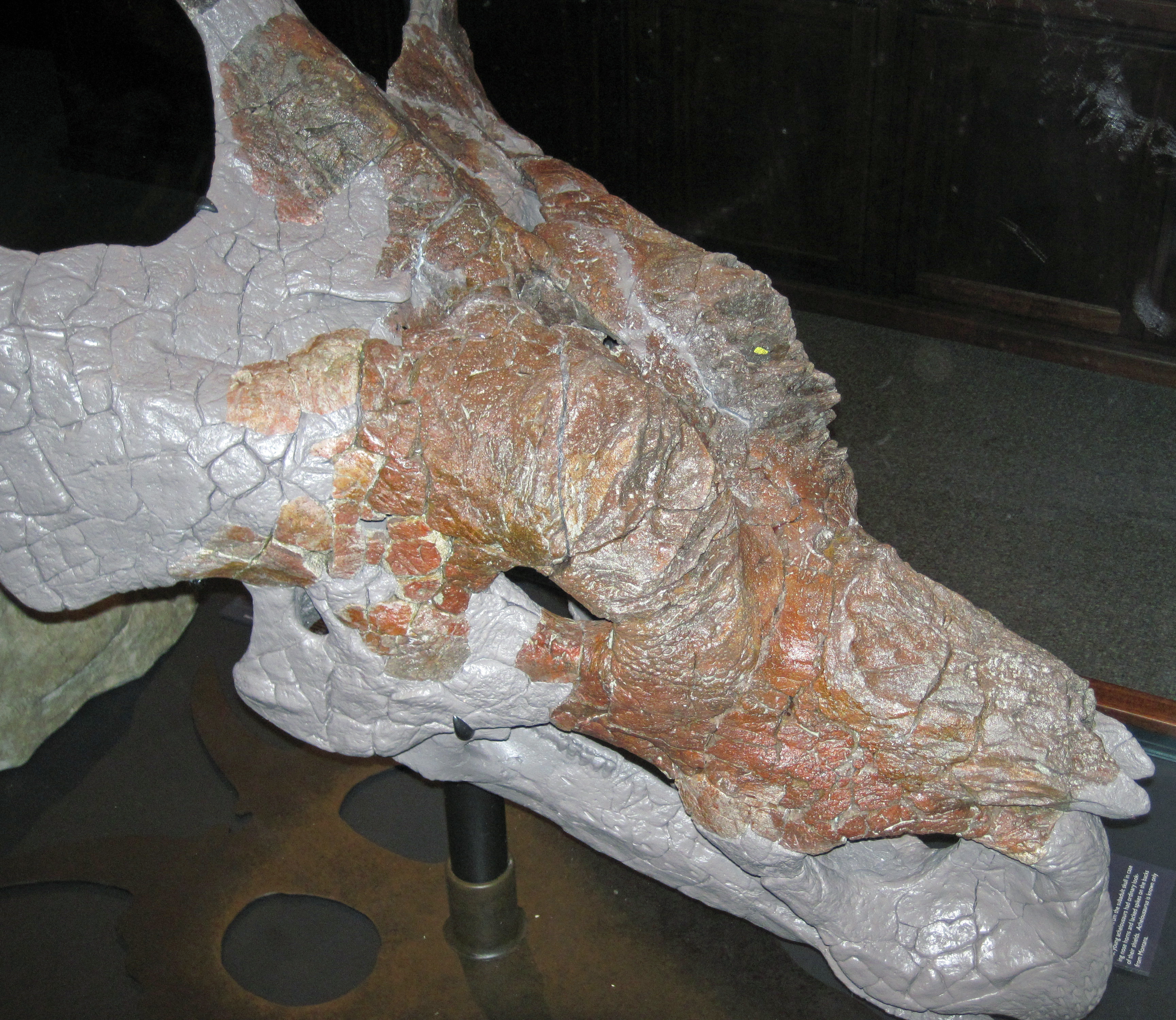
Close-ups of the bosses of the holotype specimen shown from the top (left) and right

In 1995, Sampson noted that earlier studies had found that the horns and frills of ceratopsians most likely had a function in intraspecific display and combat, and that these features would therefore have resulted from sexual selection for successful mating. Likewise, in 1997 Horner concluded that such ornamentation was used by males to establish dominance and that females would have preferred well-equipped males as their offspring would then inherit these traits, conferring a reproduction benefit. Dodson thought that in the Centrosaurinae in general the display value of the frill had been reduced compared to the nasal and supraorbital ornamentation. Sampson in 1995 rejected the possibility that the difference in skull ornamentation between Einiosaurus and Achelousaurus represented sexual dimorphism, for three reasons. Firstly, the extensive Einiosaurus bone beds did not contain any specimens with bosses, as would have been expected if one of the sexes had them. Secondly, Einiosaurus and Achelousaurus are found in strata of a different age. Thirdly, in a situation of sexual dimorphism usually only one of the sexes shows exaggerated secondary sexual characters. Einiosaurus and Achelousaurus however, each have developed a distinct set of such traits.

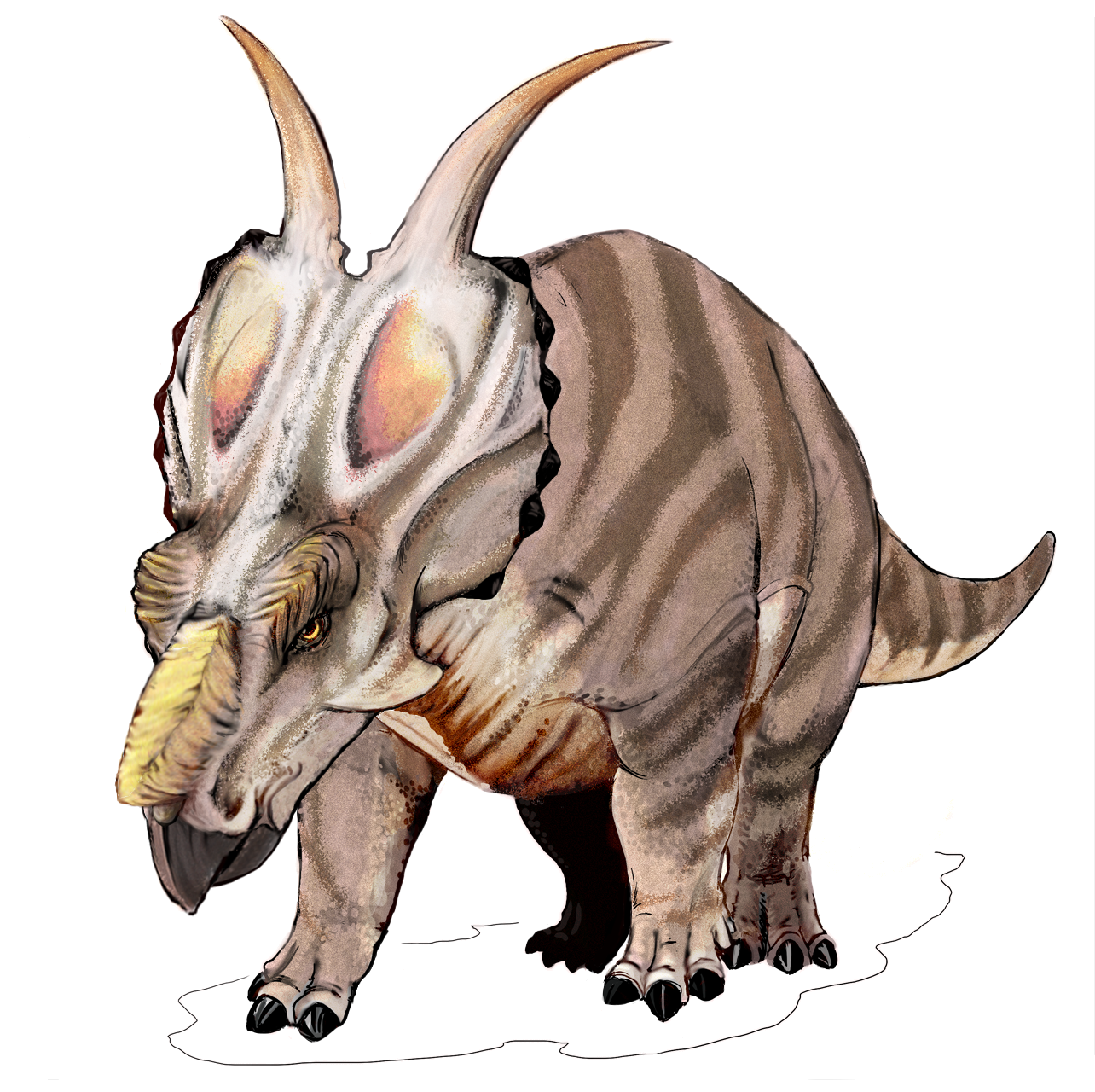
The bosses on the skull, here shown with bright colour, may have been used in display

Hieronymus, in 2009, concluded that the nasal and supraorbital bosses were used for butting or ramming the head or the flank of a rival. The bone structure indicates that the bosses were covered by cornified pads as in modern muskoxen, suggesting dominance fights similar to those of members of the Caprinae subfamily. In the latter group, an evolutionary transition can be observed, where the originally straight horns become more robust, padded, and increasingly curved downwards. The evolution from horncores into bosses in Centrosaurinae would likewise have reflected a change in fighting technique, from clashing to high-energy head-butting. Head-butting would have been an expensive and risky behavior. Opponents would have engaged this way only after assessing each other's strengths visually. For this reason, Hieronymus considered it unlikely that the bosses served for species recognition as this was already guaranteed by the innate species-specific display rituals preceding a real – instead of a ritual – fight. The bosses would have evolved for actual combat, part of a social selection in which individuals competed for scarce resources such as mates, food and breeding grounds.

Previously it had been suggested that the fusion of the first three neck vertebrae, such as seen in the mature specimen MOR 571, might have been a paleopathology, an instance of the disease spondyloarthropathy, but in 1997 it was concluded that it was more likely a normal ontogenetic trait, the vertebrae growing together to form a so-called "syncervical" to support the heavy head. All three main known specimens have syncervicals consisting of three fused neck vertebrae; the trait could have been inherited from a smaller ancestor using a stiffer neck for burrowing or food acquisition.

=== Social behavior ===
It has been claimed that ceratopsian dinosaurs were herding animals, due to the large number of known bone beds containing multiple members of the same ceratopsian species. In 2010, Hunt and Farke pointed out that this was mainly true for centrosaurine ceratopsians. Horner assumed that the horned dinosaurs at Landslide Butte lived in herds which had been killed by drought or disease. Dodson concluded that the fact that the Achelousaurus bone beds were monospecific (containing only one species) confirmed the existence of herds.

=== Metabolism and growth ===
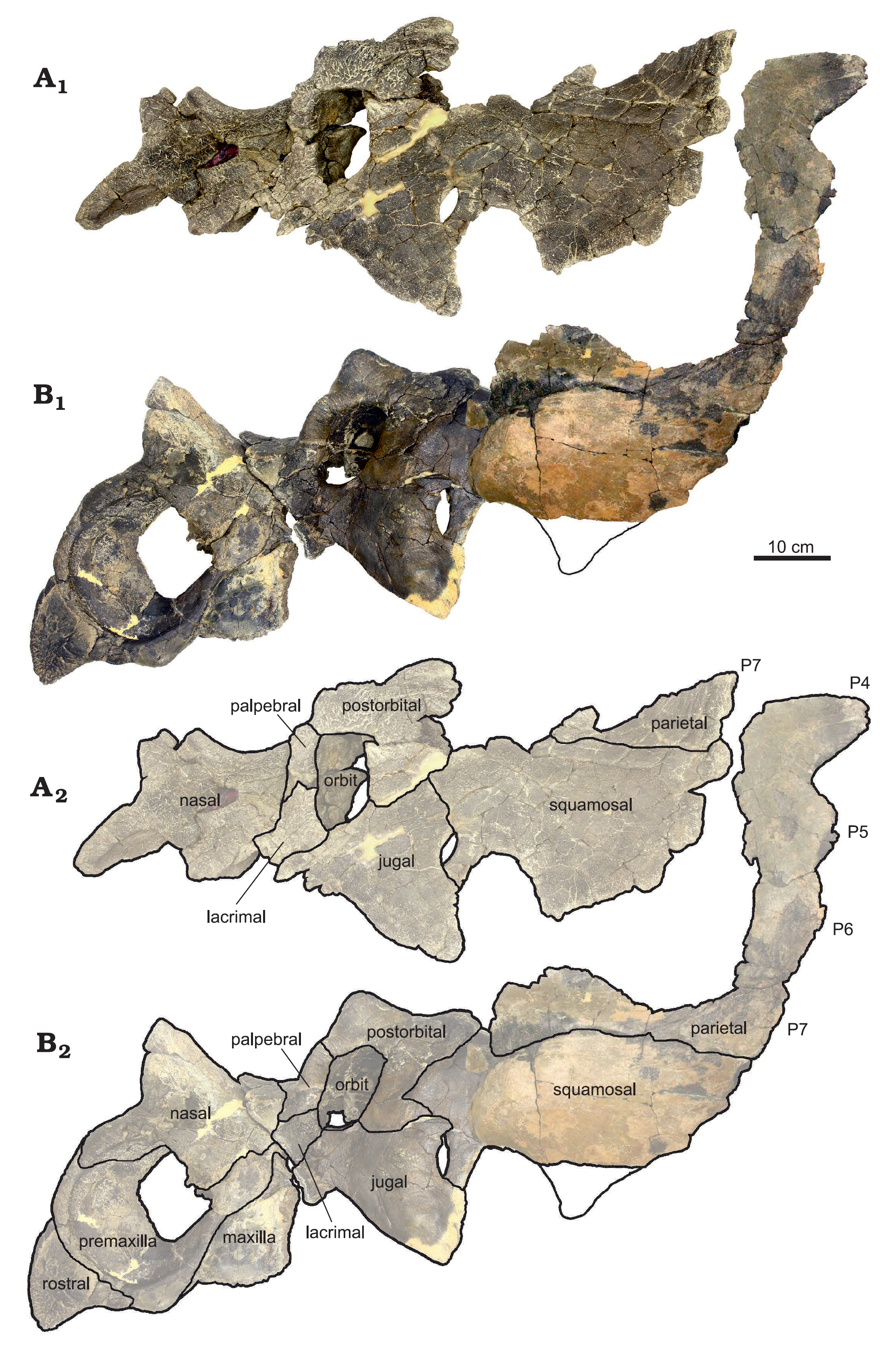
Subadult skulls of Einiosaurus (A, MOR 456 8-8-87-1) and possible Einiosaurus or Achelousaurus (B, MOR 591)

There has long been debate about the thermoregulation of dinosaurs, centered around whether they were ectotherms ("cold-blooded") or endotherms ("warm-blooded"). Mammals and birds are homeothermic endotherms, which generate their own body heat and have a high metabolism, whereas reptiles are heterothermic ectotherms, which receive most of their body heat from their surroundings. A 1996 study examined the oxygen isotopes from bone phosphates of animals from the Two Medicine Formation, including the juvenile Achelousaurus or Einiosaurus specimen MOR 591. δ^{18}O values of phosphate in vertebrate bones depend on the δ^{18}O values in their body water and the temperature when the bones were deposited, making it possible to measure fluctuations in temperature for each bone of an individual when they were deposited. The study analyzed seasonal variations in the body temperature and differences in temperature between skeletal regions, to determine whether the dinosaurs maintained their temperature seasonally. A varanid lizard fossil sampled for the study showed isotopic variation consistent with it being an heterothermic ectotherm. The variation of the dinosaurs, including MOR 591, was consistent with them being homeothermic endotherms. The metabolic rate of these dinosaurs was likely not as high as that of modern mammals and birds, and they may have been intermediate endotherms.

In 2021 a study by Wilson and Scannella pointed out that specimen MOR 591 was of a younger individual age than the Einiosaurus skull MOR 456 8-8-87-1, but of the same size. If MOR 591 could indeed be referred to Achelousaurus, this might indicate this genus reached its adult size more quickly.

== Paleoenvironment ==
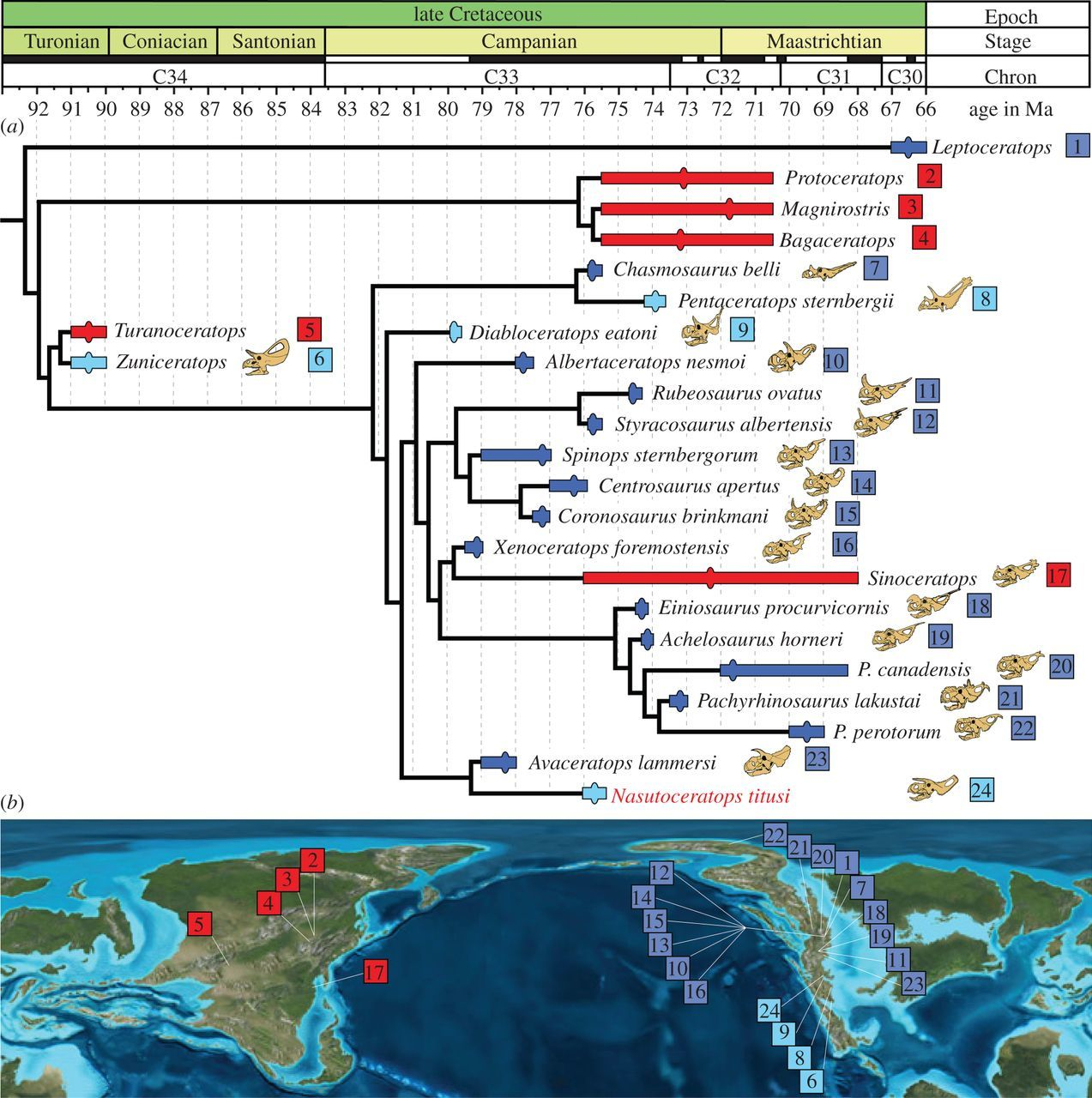
Time-calibrated phylogenetic relationships of Ceratopsidae (above), and paleogeographic map of the Late Cretaceous with distribution of ceratopsids (below), following Sampson and colleagues, 2013. Achelousaurus is 19

Achelousaurus is known from the Two Medicine Formation, which preserves coastal sediments dating from the Campanian stage of the Late Cretaceous Period, between 83 and 74 million years ago. Achelousaurus specimens are found in the uppermost member of the formation, the Flag Butte Member, which spans 77 to 74.8 Ma.

The Two Medicine Formation is typified by a warm semiarid climate. Its layers were deposed on the east coast of the Laramidia island continent (which consisted of western North America). The high cordillera in the west, combined with predominantly western winds, would have caused a rain shadow, limiting annual rainfall. Rain would mainly have fallen during the summer, when convection storms flooded the landscape. The climate would thus also have been very seasonal, with a long dry season and a short wet season. Vegetation would have been sparse and a little varied. In such conditions, horned dinosaurs would have been dependent on oxbow lakes for a continuous supply of water and food – the main river channels tending to run dry earlier – and perished in them during severe droughts when the animals concentrated around the last watering holes, causing bone beds to form. The brown paleosol in which the horned dinosaurs were found – a mixture of clay and coalified wood fragments – resembles that of modern seasonally dry swamps. The surrounding vegetation might have consisted of about 25 m (80 ft) high conifer trees. Achelousaurus ate much smaller plants, though: a 2013 study determined that ceratopsid herbivores on Laramidia were restricted to feeding on vegetation with a height of 1 m (3.5 ft) or lower.

More or less contemporary dinosaur genera of the area included Prosaurolophus, Scolosaurus, Hypacrosaurus, Einiosaurus and tyrannosaurids of uncertain classification. As proven by tooth marks, horned dinosaur fossils in the Landslide Butte Field Area had been scavenged by a large theropod predator, which Rogers suggested were Albertosaurus.

The exact composition of the fauna Achelousaurus was part of is uncertain, as its fossils have not been discovered in direct association with other taxa. Its intermediate anagenetic position suggests that Achelousaurus shared its habitat with forms roughly found in the middle or at the end of the time range of its formation. As with horned dinosaurs, Horner assumed he had found transitional taxa in other dinosaur groups of the Two Medicine Formation. One of these was a form in between Lambeosaurus and Hypacrosaurus; in 1994 he would name it Hypacrosaurus stebingeri. Today, Hypacrosaurus stebingeri is no longer seen as having evolved through anagenesis because autapomorphies of the species have been identified. Horner saw some pachycephalosaur skulls as indicative for a taxon in between Stegoceras and Pachycephalosaurus; these have not been consistently referred to a new genus. Finally, Horner thought there was a taxon present that was transitional between Daspletosaurus and Tyrannosaurus. In 2017, tyrannosaurid remains from the Two Medicine Formation were named as a new species of Daspletosaurus: Daspletosaurus horneri. The 2017 study considered it plausible that D. horneri was a direct descendant of D. torosus in a process of anagenesis, but rejected the possibility that D. horneri was the ancestor of Tyrannosaurus.

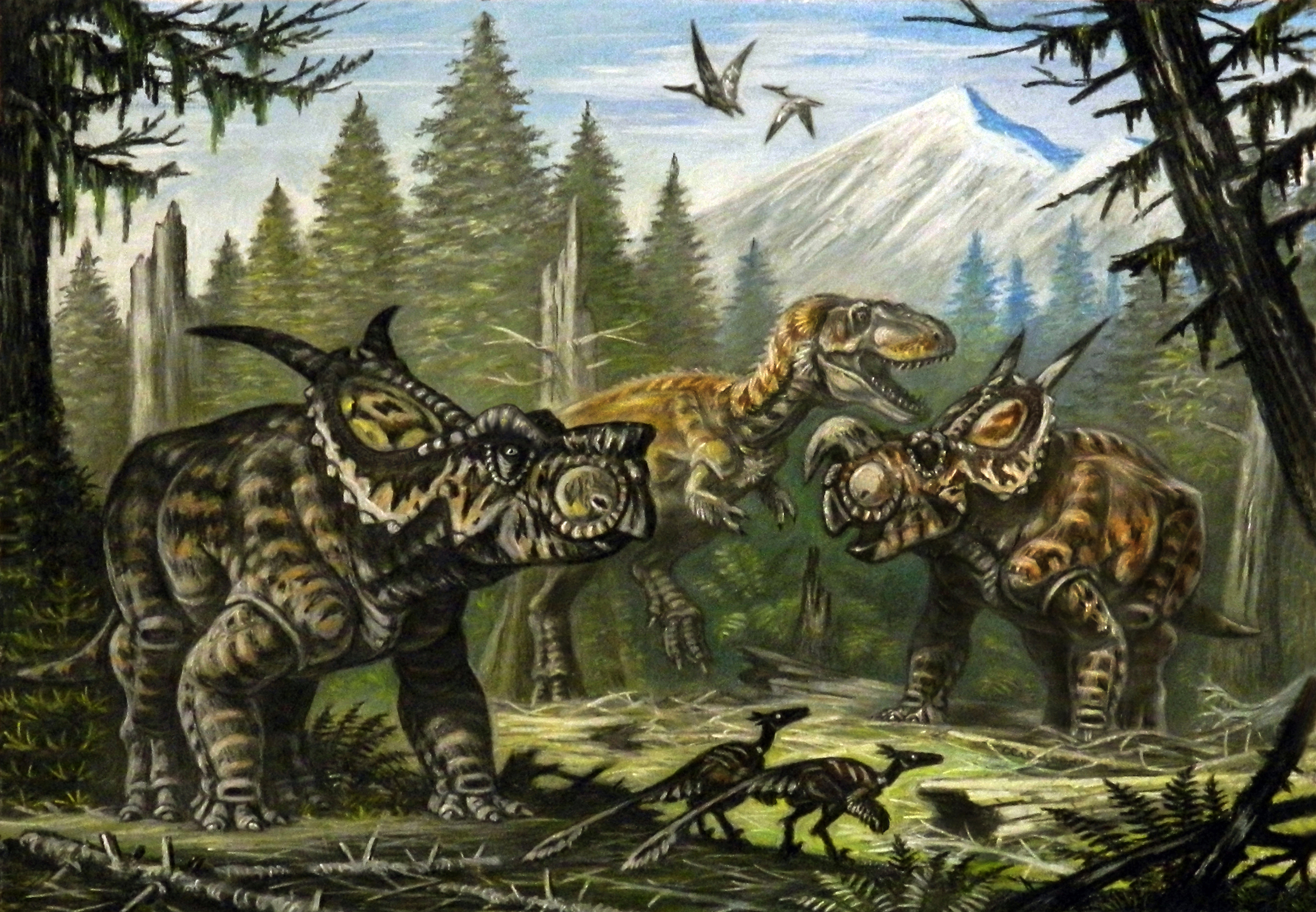
Restoration of Achelousaurus, Einiosaurus, and a tyrannosaur; it is uncertain whether the two ceratopsids were contemporaneous

Other ceratopsians from the Two Medicine Formation include Einiosaurus and Stellasaurus. In addition, remains of other indeterminate and dubious centrosaurines, including Brachyceratops, are known from the formation and though they may represent younger stages of the three valid genera, this is not possible to demonstrate. Whereas Horner assumed that Einiosaurus and Achelousaurus were separate in time, in 2010 Donald M. Henderson considered it possible that at least their descendants or ancestors were overlapping or sympatric and thus would have competed for food sources unless there had been niche partitioning. The skull of Achelousaurus was more than twice as strong than that of Einiosaurus in its bending strength and torsion resistance. This might have indicated a difference in diet to avoid competition. The bite strength of Achelousaurus, measured as an ultimate tensile strength, was 30.5 newtons per square millimeter (N/mm^{2}) at the maxillary tooth row and 18 N/mm^{2} at the beak. By comparison, it was 10.3 N per square millimeter (N/mm^{2}) and 6.40 N/mm^{2}, respectively, for Einiosaurus. Wilson and colleagues found that since the Two Medicine centrosaurines were separated stratigraphically, they were therefore possibly not contemporaneous.

The indeterminate specimen TMP 2002.76.1 is from the Dinosaur Park Formation and, if it belongs to Achelousaurus, the genus would be the stratigraphically oldest known pachyrhinosaurine taxon. Both animals occur right below the marine shales of the Bearpaw Formation, but due to longitudinal differences, TMP 2002.76.1 is about 500,000 years older than the Achelousaurus fossils from the Two Medicine Formation.

== See also ==
- Timeline of ceratopsian research

== Bibliography ==
- Brink, K. S.; Zelenitsky, D. K.; Evans, D. C.; Horner, J. R.; Therrien, F. (2015), "Cranial Morphology and Variation in Hypacrosaurus stebingeri (Ornithischia: Hadrosauridae)", in Eberth, D. A.; Evans, D. C. (eds.), Hadrosaurs, Indiana University Press, ISBN 978-0-253-01385-9
- Carr, Thomas D.; Varricchio, David J.; Sedlmayr, Jayc C.; Roberts, Eric M.; Moore, Jason R. (2017), "A new tyrannosaur with evidence for anagenesis and crocodile-like facial sensory system", Scientific Reports, 7 44942, Bibcode:2017NatSR...744942C, doi:10.1038/srep44942, PMC 5372470, PMID 28358353
- Currie, P. J.; Langston, W. Jr; Tanke, D. H. (2008), New Horned Dinosaur from an Upper Cretaceous Bone Bed in Alberta, Ottawa, Ontario: NRC Research Press, pp. 1–108, doi:10.1139/9780660198194, ISBN 978-0-660-19819-4
- Dodson, P.; Forster, C. A.; Sampson, S. D. (2004), "Ceratopsidae", in Weishampel, D. B.; Dodson, P.; Osmólska, H. (eds.), The Dinosauria (2 ed.), Berkeley: University of California Press, pp. 494–513, ISBN 978-0-520-25408-4
- Horner, J. R.; Dobb, E. (1997), Dinosaur Lives: Unearthing an Evolutionary Saga, San Diego, New York, London: Hartcourt Brace & Company
- Maiorino, L. (2015), Macroevolutionary pattern in Ceratopsian Dinosaurs (Dinosauria: Ornithischia) and biomechanics: an integrated approach by means of geometric morphometrics and finite element analysis (Doctoral Thesis), Università degli studi Roma Tre
- McDonald, A. T.; Farke, A. A. (2011), "A subadult specimen of Rubeosaurus ovatus (Dinosauria: Ceratopsidae), with observations on other Ceratopsids from the Two Medicine Formation", PLOS ONE, 6 (8) e22710, Bibcode:2011PLoSO...622710M, doi:10.1371/journal.pone.0022710, PMC 3154267, PMID 21853043
- Rogers, R. R. (1989), Taphonomy of three monospecific dinosaur bone beds in the Late Cretaceous Two Medicine Formation, northwestern Montana: Evidence for dinosaur mass mortality related to episodic drought (Master Thesis), University of Montana
- Ryan, M. J.; Holmes, R.; Russell, A. P. (2007), "A revision of the late campanian centrosaurine ceratopsid genus Styracosaurus from the Western Interior of North America", Journal of Vertebrate Paleontology, 27 (4): 944–962, doi:10.1671/0272-4634(2007)27[944:AROTLC]2.0.CO;2, S2CID 86218327
- Ryan, M. J.; Chinnery-Allgeier, B. J.; Eberth, D. A., eds. (2010), New Perspectives on Horned Dinosaurs: The Royal Tyrrell Museum Ceratopsian Symposium, Indiana University Press, ISBN 978-0-253-35358-0
  - Ford, T. L., "A Ceratopsian Compendium", in Ryan, Chinnery-Allgeier & Eberth (2010), Supplemental CD-ROM
  - Henderson, D. M., "Skull shapes as indicators of niche partitioning by sympatric chasmosaurine and centrosaurine dinosaurs", in Ryan, Chinnery-Allgeier & Eberth (2010), pp. 293–307
  - Hunt, R.; Farke, A., "Behavioral interpretations from ceratopsid bonebeds", in Ryan, Chinnery-Allgeier & Eberth (2010), pp. 447–455
  - McDonald, A. T.; Horner, J. R., "New Material of "Styracosaurus" ovatus from the Two Medicine Formation of Montana", in Ryan, Chinnery-Allgeier & Eberth (2010), pp. 156–168
  - Ryan, M. J.; Eberth, D. A.; Brinkman, D. B.; Currie, P. J.; Tanke, D. H., "A New Pachyrhinosaurus-Like Ceratopsid from the Upper Dinosaur Park Formation (Late Campanian) of Southern Alberta, Canada", in Ryan, Chinnery-Allgeier & Eberth (2010), pp. 141–155
  - Sampson, S. D.; Loewen, M. A., "Unraveling a radiation: a review of the diversity, stratigraphic distribution, biogeography, and evolution of horned dinosaurs. (Ornithischia: Ceratopsidae)", in Ryan, Chinnery-Allgeier & Eberth (2010), pp. 405–427
- VanBuren, C. S. (2013), The Function and Evolution of the Syncervical in Ceratopsian Dinosaurs with a Review of Cervical Fusion in Tetrapods (Master Thesis), University of Toronto
