= Heterologous =

Biological term

The term heterologous has several meanings in biology.

== Gene expression ==
In cell biology and protein biochemistry, heterologous expression means that a protein is experimentally put into a cell that does not normally make (i.e., express) that protein. Heterologous (meaning 'derived from a different organism') refers to the fact that often the transferred protein was initially cloned from or derived from a different cell type or a different species from the recipient.

Typically the protein itself is not transferred, but instead the 'correctly edited' genetic material coding for the protein (the complementary DNA or cDNA) is added to the recipient cell. The genetic material that is transferred typically must be within a format that encourages the recipient cell to express the cDNA as a protein (i.e., it is put in an expression vector).

Methods for transferring foreign genetic material into a recipient cell include transfection and transduction. The choice of recipient cell type is often based on an experimental need to examine the protein's function in detail, and the most prevalent recipients, known as heterologous expression systems, are chosen usually because they are easy to transfer DNA into or because they allow for a simpler assessment of the protein's function.

== Stem cells ==
In stem cell biology, a heterologous transplant refers to cells from a mixed population of donor cells. This is in contrast to an autologous transplant where the cells are derived from the same individual or an allogenic transplant where the donor cells are HLA matched to the recipient. A heterologous source of therapeutic cells will have a much greater availability than either autologous or allogenic cellular therapies.

== Structural biology ==
In structural biology, a heterologous association is a binding mode between the protomers of a protein structure. In a heterologous association, each protomer contributes a different set of residues to the binding interface. In contrast, two protomers form an isologous association when they contribute the same set of residues to the protomer-protomer interface.

== See also ==
- Autologous
- Homologous
  - Homology (biology)
- Heterogeneous
