= Paraspecies =

Species with co-existing daughter species

A paraspecies (a paraphyletic species) is a species, living or fossil, that gave rise to one or more daughter species without itself becoming extinct. Geographically widespread species that have given rise to one or more daughter species as peripheral isolates without themselves becoming extinct (i.e. through peripatric speciation) are examples of paraspecies.

Paraspecies are expected from evolutionary theory (Crisp and Chandler, 1996), and are empirical realities in many terrestrial and aquatic taxa.

== Examples ==
- A well-documented example of a living mammal species that gave rise to another living species is the evolution of the polar bear from the brown bear.
- An example of a living plant paraspecies is Pouteria cuspidata, the pouteria trees or eggfruits.

== See also ==
- Cladogenesis
- Anagenesis, also known as "phyletic change", where no branching event occurred (or is known to have occurred)
