= Anagenic =

Anagenic may refer to:

- Anagenesis, the gradual evolution of a species existing as an interbreeding population
- Anagen phase, the active growth phase of hair follicles
