= Homology =

Homology, homologous, homologation or homological may refer to:

== Sciences ==
=== Biology ===
- Homology (biology), any characteristic of biological organisms that is derived from a common ancestor
- Sequence homology, biological homology between DNA, RNA, or protein sequences
- Homologous chromosomes, chromosomes in a biological cell that pair up (synapse) during meiosis
- Homologous recombination, genetic recombination in which nucleotide sequences are exchanged between molecules of DNA
- Homologous desensitization, a receptor decreases its response to a signalling molecule when that agonist is in high concentration
- Homology modeling, a method of protein structure prediction

=== Chemistry ===
- Homologous series, a series of organic compounds having different quantities of a repeated unit
- Homologous temperature, the temperature of a material as a fraction of its absolute melting point
- Homologation reaction, a chemical reaction which produces the next logical member of a homologous series

=== Other sciences ===
- Homology (anthropology), analogy between human beliefs, practices or artifacts owing to genetic or historical connections
- Homology (psychology), behavioral characteristics that have common origins in either evolution or development
  - Homologous behaviors, behaviors typical of species that share a common ancestor that was characterized by that behavior OR behaviors in an individual that share common origins in development
- Homology (sociology), a structural resonance between the different elements making up a socio-cultural whole

== Mathematics ==
- Homology (mathematics), a procedure to associate a sequence of abelian groups or modules with a given mathematical object
- Homological algebra, a branch of mathematics

== Other uses ==
- Homologation, from the ancient Greek "to agree", to indicate the approval of a sanctioning body
- Homologation (motorsport), the process in motorsports where the sanctioning body approves a racing model for official use
- Homological word, a word expressing a property which it possesses itself

== See also ==
- Cohomology
- Homological dimension (disambiguation)
