= Homology (psychology) =

Homology in psychology, as in biology, refers to a relationship between characteristics that reflects the characteristics' origins in either evolution or development. Homologous behaviors can theoretically be of at least two different varieties. As with homologous anatomical characteristics, behaviors present in different species can be considered homologous if they are likely present in those species because the behaviors were present in a common ancestor of the two species. Alternatively, in much the same way as reproductive structures (e.g., the penis and the clitoris) are considered homologous because they share a common origin in embryonic tissues, behaviors—or the neural substrates associated with those behaviors—can also be considered homologous if they share common origins in development.

Behavioral homologies have been considered since at least 1958, when Konrad Lorenz studied the evolution of behavior. More recently, the question of behavioral homologies has been addressed by philosophers of science such as Marc Ereshefsky, psychologists such as Drew Rendall, and neuroscientists such as Georg Striedter and Glenn Northcutt. It is debatable whether the concept of homology is useful in developmental psychology.

For example, D. W. Rajecki and Randall C. Flanery, using data on humans and on nonhuman primates, argue that patterns of behaviour in dominance hierarchies are homologous across the primates.
