= Marc Ereshefsky =

American philosophy professor

Philosophical work
- Era: Contemporary philosophy
- Region: Western Philosophy
- School: Analytic
- Main interests: philosophy of science, biology, philosophy of biology,

Marc Ereshefsky is a professor of philosophy at the University of Calgary, specializing in the philosophy of science and the philosophy of biology. His research focuses on issues on the intersection of philosophy and biology. Ereshefsky is specifically known for his work on taxonomy, systematics and natural kinds. With Thomas Reydon he has argued that homeostatic property cluster theory both omits kinds that scientific classifications recognise and admits kinds that science rejects, and has proposed an account based on classificatory programs in its place. His research has been supported by the Social Sciences and Humanities Research Council of Canada, the Canadian Institutes of Health Research, and the National Science Foundation.

== Personal life ==
Ereshefsky lives in Calgary with his wife, two sons, Jacob and Josh, and their puppy. His favourite weekend activities include hiking in the nearby Rocky Mountains, and going for runs.

== Publications ==
Books

- The Units of Evolution: Essays on the Nature of Species, edited with introductory essays for Bradford Books / MIT Press 1992 ISBN 978-0262050449
- The Poverty of the Linnaean Hierarchy: A Philosophical Study of Biological Taxonomy. Cambridge University Press 2001, 2007. ISBN 978-0521781701
