= Cladogenesis =

Evolutionary splitting of a parent species into two distinct species, forming a clade

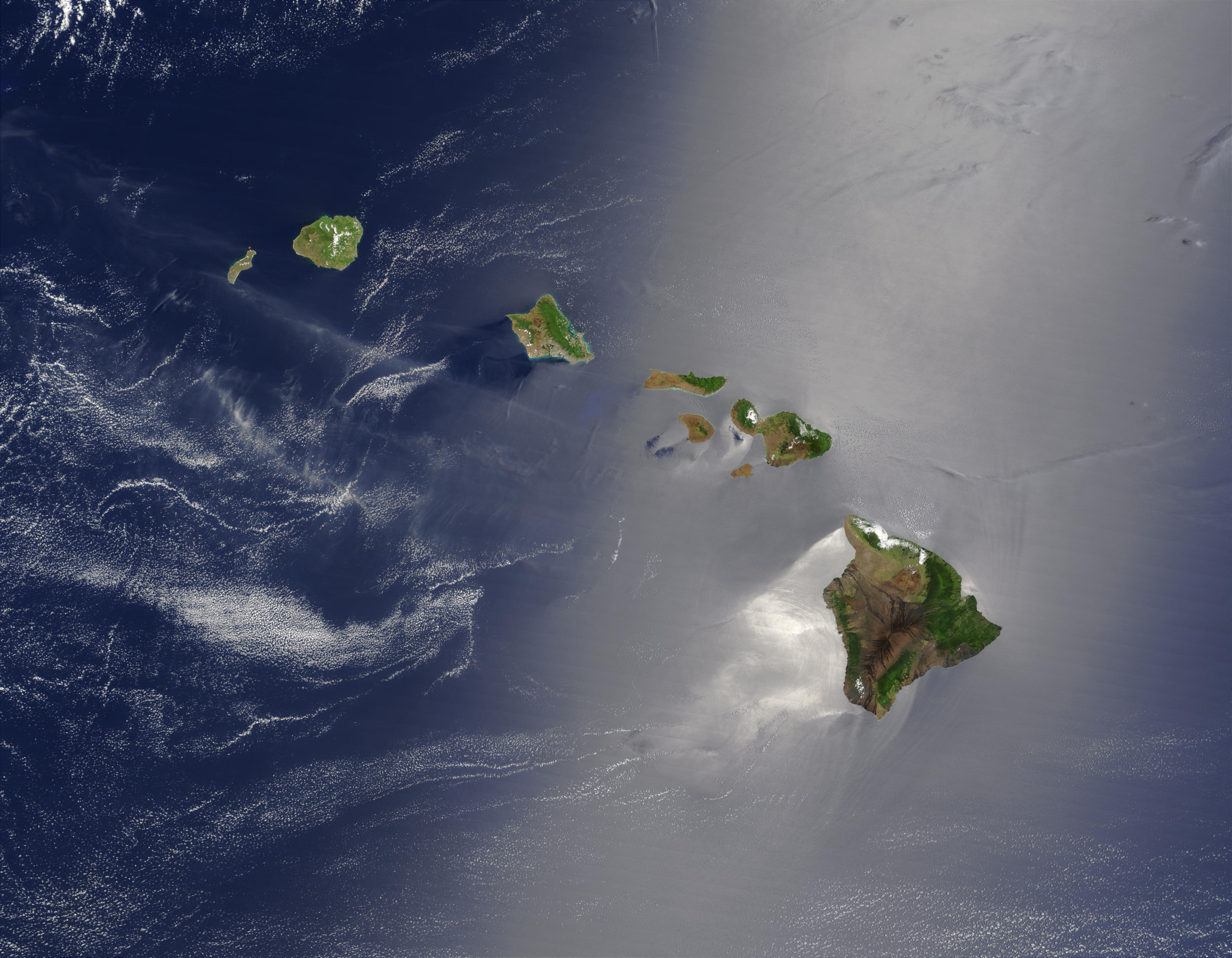
An example of cladogenesis today is the Hawaiian archipelago, to which stray organisms traveled across the ocean via ocean currents and winds. Most of the species on the islands are not found anywhere else on Earth due to evolutionary divergence.

Cladogenesis is an evolutionary splitting of a parent species into two distinct species, forming a new clade that contains two newly separated lineages sharing the common ancestor.

Cladogenesis typically occurs after a few organisms of an original population are abruptly transported to new or distant areas, or after environmental changes cause extinction(s) that open up new ecological niches for the survivors—or that cause population bottlenecks and founder effects that change allele frequencies of the diverging populations compared to their ancestral population.

Events that cause populations to be dispersed over distant areas may well result in new lineages that survive and reproduce, and evolve to suit their new environments; ultimately to emerge as new species after subsequent natural selection, mutations, or genetic drift.

Cladogenesis is in contrast to anagenesis, in which an ancestral species gradually accumulates change, and eventually, when enough is accumulated, the species is sufficiently distinct and different enough from its original starting form that it can be labeled as a new form - a new species. With anagenesis, the lineage in a phylogenetic tree does not split.

To determine whether a speciation event is cladogenesis or anagenesis, researchers may use simulation, evidence from fossils, molecular evidence from the DNA of different living species, or modelling. It has however been debated whether the distinction between cladogenesis and anagenesis is necessary at all in evolutionary theory.

== See also ==
- Anagenesis
- Evolutionary biology
- Speciation
- Saltation
