= List of Greek and Latin roots in English/H–O =

The following is an alphabetical list of Greek and Latin roots, stems, and prefixes commonly used in the English language from H to O. See also the lists from A to G and from P to Z.

Some of those used in medicine and medical technology are not listed here but instead in the entry for List of medical roots, suffixes and prefixes.

== Collation ==
Note that root groups such as "ad-, a-, ac-, af-, ag-, al-, am-, an-, ap-, ar-, as-, at-" are collated under the head item (first item listed), which is sometimes followed by alternative roots that might have collated earlier in the table had they been listed separately (in this example, "a-" and "ac-").

== Roots H–O ==
Lists of Greek and Latin roots in English beginning with other letters:
- A
- B
- C
- D
- E
- F
- G
- H
- I
- J
- K
- L
- M
- N
- O
- P
- Q
- R
- S
- T
- U
- V
- X
- Z

== H ==
Root	Meaning in English	Origin language	Etymology (root origin)	English examples
hab-, -hib-, habit-, -hibit-	have	Latin	habere "to have", habitus "habit", habitare "to live (reside)"	ability, able, debenture, debile, debilitate, debility, debit, debitor, debt, debtor, devoir, disability, disable, disenable, disinhibit, disinhibition, due, duty, enable, enablement, endeavor, exhibit, exhibition, exhibitor, habeas corpus, habendum, habenula, habile, habilitate, hability, habit, habitable, habitance, habitant, habitat, habitation, habitator, habitual, habituate, habituation, habitude, habitudinal, inability, indubitable, inhabile, inhabit, inhabitable, inhabitant, inhabitation, inhibit, inhibition, inhibitory, nonhabitual, prebend, prebendary, prohibit, prohibition, prohibitive, prohibitory, provender, rehabilitant, rehabilitate, rehabilitation, rehabilitative, rehabilitator
hadr-	thick	Greek	ἁδρός (hadrós)	Hadrocodium, Hadromys, hadron, Hadropithecus, hadrosaur, hadrosaurid
haem-, hem-	blood	Greek	αἷμα, αἵματος (haîma, haímatos)	anaemia, anemia, haematemesis, haematopoiesis, haematuria, haemochromatosis, haemophilia, haemophobia, haemoptysis, haemorrhage, haemorrhoid, haemosiderosis, haemostatic, hematocrit, hematogenesis, hematoma, hematophagous, hematophagy, hematopoiesis, hematopoietic, hematuria, hemocoel, hemocyte, hemoglobin, hemoglobinuria, hemophagy, hemophilia, hemophiliac, hemoptysis, hemorrhage, hemorrhagic, hemorrhea, hemorrhoid, hemorrhoidectomy, hemosiderin, hemosiderosis, hemostat, hemotherapy, hyperaemia, hyperemia, hyphaema, hyphema, methemoglobin, methemoglobinemia, microhematuria, microhemorrhage, polycythaemia
haere-	choose, take	Greek	αἱρεῖν (haireîn), αἱρεῖσθαι (haireîsthai), αἱρετός (hairetós), αἱρετικός (hairetikós), αἵρεσις (haíresis)	aphaeresis, diaeresis, heresiarch, heresy, heretic, plasmapheresis, synaeresis, syneresis
hal-	salt	Greek	ἅλς, ἁλός (háls, halós), ἅλινος (hálinos)	halide, halieutic, halite, halochromic, halochromism, halogen, halomancy, halophile, halophyte, oxohalide, thermohaline
hal-, -hel-	breathe	Latin	halare, halatus	anhelation, anhele, anhelous, exhalable, exhalant, exhalation, exhale, halitus, inhalable, inhalant, inhalation, inhale
hapl-	simple, single	Greek	ἁπλοῦς (haploûs), ἅπλωσις (háplōsis), ἅπλωμα (háplōma)	haplochromine, haplodiploid, haplodiploidy, haplography, haploid, haplology, haplont, haplontic, haplophase, haplopia, haplosis, haplotype
haur-, haust-	draw	Latin	haurire, haustus	exhaust, exhaustible, exhaustion, exhaustive, hauriant, haurient, haustellate, haustellum, haustorium, haustrum, inexhaustible, nonexhaustive
heb-	youth	Greek	ἥβη (hḗbē), ἡβητικός (hēbētikós), ἔφηβος (éphēbos), ἡβᾶν (hēbân), ἡβάσκω, ἡβητής (hēbētḗs)	ephebeum, ephebia, ephebiatrics, ephebic, ephebiphobia, ephebophilia, ephebos, hebephilia, hebephobia, hebephrenia, hebetic, hebiatrics, hebophile, hebophilia
hed- (ΕΔ)	sit	Greek	ἕδος, ἕδεος (hédos, hédeos), ἕδρα (hédra), ἕζεσθαι (hézesthai)	cathedra, chair, dodecahedron, dodecahemidodecahedron, endohedric, ephedra, exedra, hemipolyhedron, hexahedron, octahedron, pentahedroid, pentahedron, polyhedron, pyritohedron, rhombohedron, sanhedrin, synedrion, tetrahedroid, trapezohedron, trisoctahedron
hed-	pleasant, sweet	Greek	ἥδεσθαι, ἡδόμενον, ἡδύς (hēdómenon, hēdús), ἡδύτης, σϝηδύς, ἡδονή (hēdonḗ)	anhedonia, anhedonic, hedonics, hedonism, hedonist, hedonistic, hedonology, hyphedonia
heg-	lead	Greek	ἄγω, ἡγεῖσθαι (hēgeîsthai), ἡγούμενος (hēgoúmenos), ἡγεμών (hēgemṓn), ἡγεμονία, ἡγεμονικός	diegesis, diegetic, eisegesis, exegesis, exegete, exegetic, hegemon, hegemonic, hegemony, hegumen, hypodiegetic, metadiegetic, protohegumen
heli-	sun	Greek	ἥλιος (hḗlios)	aphelion, heliocentric, heliocentrism, heliodor, heliograph, heliolatry, heliomania, heliometer, heliopause, Heliophila, heliophobia, heliophyte, Helios, helioscope, heliosphere, heliostat, heliotherapy, heliotrope, heliotropic, heliotropism, helium, parhelion, perihelion
helic-	something twisted or spiral	Greek	ϝελίσσω, ἑλίσσειν (helíssein), ἕλιξ, ἕλικος (hélix, hélikos), ἕλιξις, ἕλιγμα (hélixis, héligma), (helikoeidḗs)	anthelix, antihelix, helicine, helicograph, helicoid, helicopter, helicospore, helix
Hell-	Greece, Hellas	Greek	Ἑλλάς, ἑλλάδος (Hellás, helládos)	Helladic, Hellenic, Hellenism, Hellenistic
helminth-	worm	Greek	ἕλμινς, ἕλμινθος (hélmins, hélminthos)	anthelmintic, antihelminthic, helminth, helminthic, helminthoid
helot-	enslaved	Greek	Εἵλως, Εἵλωτος, Εἱλώτης	Helot, helotism, helotry
hemer-	day	Greek	ἡμέρα (hēméra)	Decameron, ephemeral, ephemeris, ephemeron, ephemerous, hemeralopia
hemer-	tame	Greek	ἥμερος (hḗmeros), ἡμερότης (hēmerótēs)	hemeroby, hemerochora, hemerophile
hemi-	half	Greek	ἥμισυς (hḗmisus)	anhemitonic, hemiballismus, hemicryptophyte, hemicube, hemicycle, hemidesmosome, hemimelia, hemimetabolic, hemimetabolism, hemimetaboly, hemiparesis, hemiplegia, hemipolyhedron, hemisphere, hemitonic
hen-	one	Greek	ἕν (hén), ἑνάς, ἑνάδος (henás, henádos), ἕνωσις (hénōsis)	enosis, enotikon, henad, hendiadys, henotheism, hyphen
hendec-	eleven	Greek	ἕνδεκα (héndeka)	hendecagon, hendecagram, hendecagrammic, hendecane, hendecasyllabic, hendecasyllable hendecahedron
hepat-	liver	Greek	ἧπαρ, ἥπατος (hêpar, hḗpatos), ἡπατικός (hēpatikós)	heparin, hepatic, hepatitis, hepatocyte, hepatology, hepatomancy, hepatoscopy, hepatotoxic, hepatotoxin, hepatotropic
hept-	seven	Greek	ἑπτά (heptá)	heptachord, heptagon, heptagram, heptagraph, heptahedron, heptamer, heptameric, heptameter, Heptateuch, heptathlete, heptathlon, heptatonic, heptode
her-, heir-	heir	Latin	heres (genitive heredis)	heir, heiress, hereditary, heredity, heritage, inherit
here-, hes-	cling, stick	Latin	haerere, haesus	adhere, adherence, adherend, adherent, adhesion, adhesive, cohere, coherence, coherent, cohesion, cohesive, decoherence, hesitancy, hesitant, hesitate, hesitation, hesitator, incoherent, inhere, inherency, inherent, inhesion, nonadherence, nonadherent, nonadhesive
herald-	messenger, envoy	Latin	heraldus	herald, heraldic, heraldry
herb-	grass	Latin	herba	herbal, herbicide, herbivore
heres-, heret-	choose, take	Greek	αἱρεῖν (haireîn) "to take, choose"	heresy, heretic, heretical
herm-	Hermes	Greek	Ἑρμῆς (Hermês)	herm, hermaphrodite, hermetic
hermeneu-	interpret, explain	Greek	ἑρμηνεύς (hermēneús), ἑρμηνεύω (hermēneúō), ἑρμηνευτικός (hermēneutikós), ἑρμήνευσις, ἑρμήνευμα	hermeneutic, hermeneutics
hero-	hero	Greek	ἥρως, ἥρωος (hḗrōs, hḗrōos), ἡρωίνη (hērōínē), ἡρωϊκός (hērōïkós), ἡρωϊσμός (hērōïsmós)	antihero, hero, heroic, heroine, heroism
herp-	creep	Greek	ἕρπειν (hérpein), ἕρπης, ἕρπητος (hérpēs, hérpētos)	herpes, herpetology
heter-	different, other	Greek	ἕτερος (héteros)	heterochromatin, heterodox, heterodoxy, heterogeneity, heterogeneous, heterophobia, heterosexuality, heterosexual, heterosis, heterotic
heur-	find	Greek	εὑρίσκειν (heurískein), εὕρηκα (heúrēka), εὕρημα (heúrēma)	eureka, heuristic, metaheuristic
hex-	six	Greek	ἕξ (héx), ἑξάς, ἑξάδος (hexás, hexádos)	hexachord, hexad, hexadic, hexagon, hexagram, hexahedron, hexamer, hexamerous, hexameter, hexapod, hexastyle, hexasyllabic, Hexateuch, hexatonic, hexode, tetrahemihexahedron
hi-	gape	Latin	hiare	dehisce, dehiscence, dehiscent, hiatal, hiatus, indehiscence, indehiscent, inhiation
hibern-	wintry	Latin	hibernus	hibernacle, hibernaculum, hibernal, hibernate, hibernation, hibernator
hidrot-	sweat	Greek	ἱδρώς, ἱδρῶτος (hidrṓs, hidrōtos), ἱδροῦν (hidroûn), ἵδρωσις (hídrōsis)	anhidrosis, dyshidrosis, dyshidrotic, hematidrosis, hidrocystoma, hidropoiesis, hidroschesis, hidrosis, hidrotic, hyperhidrosis, hypohidrosis
hiem-	winter	Latin	hiems	hiemal
hier-	holy, sacred	Greek	ἱερός (hierós)	hierarch, hierarchy, hieratic, hierocracy, hierodeacon, hieroglyph, hieroglyphic, hierogram, hierolatry, hieromonk, hierurgy
hipp-	horse	Greek	ἵππος (híppos)	ephippium, hippeis, hippocampus, hippodrome, hippology, Hippolyte, hippomancy, hippophagy, hippophile, hippophobia, hippopotamus, parahippocampus
hirsut-	hairy	Latin	hirtus, hirsutus	hirsute, hirsutulous
hispid-	bristly	Latin	hispidus	hispidity, hispidulous
histri-	actor	Latin	histrio, histrionis	histrionic
hod-	way	Greek	ὁδός (hodós)	anode, cathode, diode, electrode, episode, ergodic, exodos, exodus, heptode, herpolhode, hodograph, hodology, hodometer, hodonym, hodophobia, hodoscope, hydathode, method, methodic, Methodism, Methodist, methodology, octode, parodos, pentode, period, periodic, synod, tetrode, triode
hol-	whole	Greek	ὅλος (hólos), ὁλικός (holikós)	catholic, holiatry, holism, holistic, holography, holomorphic, holonomy
hom-	same	Greek	ὁμός (homós)	homiletic, homily, homogeneous, homograph, homologous, homology, homomorphism, homonym, homophobia, homophone, homosexual, homozygous
homal-	even, flat	Greek	ὁμαλός (homalós) "even", from ὁμός (homós) "same"	anomalous, anomaly
homin-	human	Latin	homo, hominis	ad hominem, bonhomie, homage, hombre, homicide, hominid, homuncular, homunculus, human, humane, humanitarian, humanity, inhuman, inhumane, inhumanity, Nemo, nonhuman, omber, ombre, prehuman, subhuman, superhuman, transhuman
homoe-, home-	like, similar	Greek	ὅμοιος (hómoios), ὁμοῖος, ὁμοιότης	homeomorphism, homeopathy, homeostasis, homeothermy, homoeopathy, homoiotherm, homoiothermic
honor-	esteem	Latin	honos, honoris	dishonor, dishonorable, honorable, honorand, honorarium, honorary, honoree, honorific
hor-	boundary	Greek	ὅρος (hóros), ὁρίζειν (horízein)	aorist, aphorism, aphorismus, aphorize, diorite, horizon, horopter, horotelic
hor-	hour	Greek	ὥρα (hṓra)	horologist, horology, horometry, horoscope
horm-	that which excites	Greek	ὁρμᾶν, ὁρμεῖν (hormân, hormeîn), ὁρμή (hormḗ), ὅρμησις (hórmēsis), ὁρμῶν (hormôn)	horme, hormephobia, hormesis, hormetic, hormic, hormone
hort-	garden	Latin	hortus, horti	antecourt, cohort, cortege, court, courteous, courtesan, courtesy, courtier, curtain, curtilage, Curtis, discourteous, discourtesy, frontcourt, horticultural, horticulture
hospit-	host	Latin	hospes, hospitis	co-host, hospice, hospitable, hospital, hospitality, host, hostal, hostel, hosteler, hostler, hotel, hotelier, inhospitable, inhospitality
host-	enemy	Latin	hostis	host, hostile, hostility
hum-	ground	Latin	humus, humare	disinhume, exhumation, exhume, humate, humation, humble, humic, humicolous, humiliate, humiliation, humility, humus, inhumation, inhume
hyal-	glass	Greek	ὕαλος (húalos)	hyaline, hyaloid
hybr-	wantonness	Greek	ὕβρις (húbris), ὑβρίζω, ὕβριστος, ὑβριστικός (hubrízō, húbristos, hubristikós), ὑβρισμός, ὕβρισμα, ὑβριστής	hubris, hubristic, hybris, hybristic
hydn-	truffle	Greek	ὕδνον (húdnon)	hydnoid, Hydnum
hydr-	water	Greek	ὕδωρ, ὕδατος (húdōr, húdatos), ὕδρα (húdra)	clepsydra, dehydrate, hydathode, hydatid, hydatidosis, hydra, hydrant, hydrate, hydraulic, hydraulics, hydrochloric, hydrodynamics, hydroelectric, hydrogen, hydrologist, hydrology, hydrolysis, hydromancy, hydrophile, hydrophilic, hydrophily, hydrophobia, hydrophobic, hydroponic, hydrosphere, hydrostat, hydrostatic, hydrothermic, hydrous, hydrozoa, polyhydric
hygie-	healthy	Greek	ὑγιής (hugiḗs), ὑγίεια (hugíeia), ὑγιεινός (hugieinós), ὑγιάζειν	Hygieia, hygiene, hygienic, hygienics, hygienist
hygr-	wet	Greek	ὑγρός (hugrós)	hygric, hygroma, hygrometer
hymen-	skin or membrane	Greek	ὑμήν, ὑμένος (humḗn, huménos)	hymen, hymenium, hymenomycete, hymenophore, hymenoplasty, Hymenoptera, hymenorrhaphy, hymenotomy
hyo-	U-shaped	Greek	ὑοειδής (huoeidḗs)	hyoid, hyostyly
hyp-, hypo-	under , below	Greek	ὑπό (hupó)	hyphen, hypoallergenic, hypodermic, hypogene, hypothermia, hypothesis, hypotonic, hypoxemia, hypoxia
hyper-	above, over	Greek	ὑπέρ (hupér)	hyper, hyperbaric, hyperbola, hyperbole, Hyperion, hyperlink, hyperoxia, hyperpyrexia, hyperthermia, hypertonic
hyph-	weave	Greek	ὑφαίνειν (huphaínein), ὕφασμα, ὑφή (huphḗ) "web"	hypha, hyphomycete, hyphopodium
hypn-	sleep	Greek	ὕπνος (húpnos)	hypnagogia, hypnagogic, hypnolepsy, hypnophobia, hypnopompia, hypnopompic, hypnosis, hypnotherapy, hypnotic, hypnotist, hypnotize
hyps-	height	Greek	ὕψι, ὕψιστος, ὕψος (húpsos), ὑψοῦ, ὑψόθεν	hypsography, hypsometer, hypsophobia
hys-	hog	Greek	ὗς (hûs), ὕαινα (húaina)	hyena, hyenoid
hyster-	womb	Greek	ὑστέρα (hustéra)	hysteralgia, hysteratresia, hysterectomy, hysteria, hysteric, hysterosalpingography
hyster-	later	Greek	ὑστερεῖν (hustereîn), ὕστερος (hústeros), ὑστέρησις (hustérēsis), ὑστέρημα (hustérēma)	hysteresis, hysteretic, hysteron proteron

Lists of Greek and Latin roots in English beginning with other letters:
- A
- B
- C
- D
- E
- F
- G
- H
- I
- J
- K
- L
- M
- N
- O
- P
- Q
- R
- S
- T
- U
- V
- X
- Z

== I ==
Root	Meaning in English	Origin language	Etymology (root origin)	English examples
i-	go	Greek	ἰέναι (iénai), ἴμμεναι, ἰόν, ἰών (ímmenai, ión, iṓn)	anion, anionic, cation, cationic, ion, ionic, ionize, polyanion, polycation
iatr-	heal	Greek	ἰᾶσθαι (iâsthai), ἰατρός (iatrós), ἰατρικός (iatrikós), ἰατρεύειν (iatreúein), ἰατρεία (iatreía), ἴασις, ἴαμα	iatrogenic, physiatry, podiatrist, podiatry, psychiatrist, psychiatry
ichthy-	fish	Greek	ἰχθύς, ἰχθύος (ikhthús, ikhthúos)	ichthyology, Ichthyophaga, ichthyophobia, ichthyoplankton, ichthyosis
icos-	twenty	Greek	ϝεικοσι, εἴκοσι (eíkosi), εἰκοσάς, εἰκοσάκις "twenty times"	hemi-icosahedron, icosagon, icosahedron
icter-	jaundice	Greek	ἴκτερος (íkteros), ἰκτερικός (ikterikós), ἰκτεριάω	icteric, icterogenic, icterohemorrhagic, icterohepatitis, icteroid, icterus
id- (ϜΙΔ)	shape, form, picture	Greek	εἶδειν (eîdein), εἶδος (eîdos)	eidetic, eidolon, eidos, idol, idolater, idolatry, idyll, idyllic, idyllist, pareidolia
ide-	idea, thought	Greek	ἰδεῖν (ideîn), ἰδέα (idéa)	ideogram, ideologue, ideology
idi-	own, peculiarity	Greek	ϝίδιος, ἴδιος (ídios), "private, personal, one's own"	idiolect, idiom, idiopathic, idiopathy, idiophone, idiosyncrasy, idiosyncratic, idiot, idiotic
ign-	fire	Latin	ignis	igneous, ignite, ignition
ignorare-	"not to know, to be unacquainted; mistake, misunderstand	Latin	ignotus	ignore, ignorant, ignorance
imagin-	copy	Latin	imāgō, imāginis	image, imagine
imbr-	heavy rain	Latin	imber, imbris	ignimbrite, imbrex, imbricate, imbrication, imbriferous
in-	sinew	Greek	ἴς, ἰνός (ís, inós), ἰνίον (iníon)	inion, inotrope, inotropic
in- (1), il-, im-	in, on	Latin	in	illuminate, import, incur, intend, invite
in- (2), il-, im-, ir-	not, un- (negation)	Latin	in-	illicit, impossible, inimical, insane, irrational
inan-	empty, vain	Latin	inanitio "emptiness" and inanitas "worthlessness", from inanire "to empty", from inanis "empty, void, worthless"	inane, inanition, inanity
infra-	below, under	Latin	infra	infrared, infrastructure
insul-	island	Latin	insula	insular, insulation
integr-	whole, complete	Latin	in-, teg-	integrate, integration, integer, integrational, disintegrate, integral, unintegrated
inter-	among, between	Latin	inter (preposition)	intercollegiate, intermission, intersection
intra-	inside , within	Latin	intra	intramural, intravenous
iota-	I, i	Greek	iota	iotacism
irasc-, irat-	be angry	Latin	irasci "grow angry", from ira "anger"	irascible, irate, ire
irid-	rainbow	Latin	iris	iridescent
is-, iso-	equal, same	Greek	ϝίσϝος (wíswos), ἴσος (ísos)	isogloss, isograph, isometric, isomorphic, isosceles, isotonic, isotropic
-itis	inflammation	Greek	-ῖτις	appendicitis, diverticulitis, arthritis, tonsillitis, dermatitis, iritis, carditis, gastritis, colitis, cystitis
ischi-	hip joint	Greek	ἰσχίον (iskhíon), ἰσχιαδικός (iskhiadikós)	ischiadic, ischium, sciatic, sciatica
iter-	again	Latin	iterum, iterare	iteration
itiner-	journey	Latin	iter, itineris	itinerary

Lists of Greek and Latin roots in English beginning with other letters:
- A
- B
- C
- D
- E
- F
- G
- H
- I
- J
- K
- L
- M
- N
- O
- P
- Q
- R
- S
- T
- U
- V
- X
- Z

== J ==
Root	Meaning in English	Origin language	Etymology (root origin)	English examples
jac-	lie	Latin	jaceo "to be thrown"	adjacency, adjacent, circumjacency, circumjacent, ease, easy, interjacent, interjoist, joist, nonadjacent, subjacent, superjacent
jac-, -ject-	cast, throw	Latin	jacio (also spelled iacio), iectus	abject, adjectival, adjective, conjectural, conjecture, deject, dejection, disject, disjection, ejaculate, ejaculation, ejaculatory, eject, ejecta, ejection, ejective, ejectment, ejector, inject, injection, injective, injector, interject, interjection, interjectional, interjector, interjectory, introject, introjection, introjective, jactation, jactitation, jaculate, jaculation, jaculator, jaculatory, jaculiferous, jet, jetsam, jettison, nonobjective, object, objectification, objection, objectionable, objective, objectivity, objector, parget, project, projectile, projection, projective, projector, reject, rejectamenta, rejection, subject, subjection, subjective, subjectivity, subjicible, surjection, surjective, traject, trajectile, trajection, trajectory, trijet
janu-	door	Latin	janua	janitor, January
joc-	jest	Latin	jocus (also spelled iocus)	jewel, jewelry, jocose, jocosity, jocular, jocularity, joke, jongleur, juggle, injucundity, jocund, jocundity
journ-	pertaining to the day, daily	Latin	diurnus (also spelled journe)	adjourn, journal, journalist, journey, journeyman, sojourn
judic-	judge	Latin	iudex, iūdicis	adjudicate, adjudication, adjudicative, adjudicator, adjudicatory, extrajudicial, injudicious, judge, judgement, judgment, judgmental, judicable, judicative, judicator, judicatory, judicature, judicial, judiciary, judicious, nonjudgmental, nonjudicial, prejudge, prejudgment, prejudice, prejudicial, quasijudicial
jug-	yoke	Latin	jugo, jugum	conjugal, subjugate
jung-, junct-	join	Latin	iungo, junctus	adjoin, adjoint, adjunct, adjunction, adjunctive, conjoin, conjoint, conjunct, conjunction, conjunctive, disjoin, disjoint, disjunct, disjunction, disjunctive, enjoin, enjoinder, enjoinment, injunction, injunctive, join, junction, juncture, junta, junto, nondisjunction, nonjoinder, rejoin, rejoinder, sejoin, sejungible, subjoin, subjoinder, subjunctive, surrejoinder
junior-	younger	Latin	junior	junior, juniority
jus-, jur-	law, justice	Latin	ius, iuris	abjure, jurisprudence, jury, just, justice, objurgate, perjury
juv-, jut-	help	Latin	juvo, jutus	adjument, adjutant, adjutor, adjutory, adjutrix, coadjutant, coadjutor
juven-	young, youth	Latin	juvenis	juvenile, rejuvenate
juxta-	beside, near	Latin	juxta	juxtaposition

Lists of Greek and Latin roots in English beginning with other letters:
- A
- B
- C
- D
- E
- F
- G
- H
- I
- J
- K
- L
- M
- N
- O
- P
- Q
- R
- S
- T
- U
- V
- X
- Z

== K ==
Root	Meaning in English	Origin language	Etymology (root origin)	English examples
-kary-	nucleus	Greek	καρυον (karyon)	Eukaryote, Prokaryote
kastan-	brown	Greek	καφέ (kafé)	Kastanophobia
kilo-	thousand	Greek	χίλιοι (khílioi)	kilobyte, kilogram, kilometer, kiloliter
kine-, cine-	movement, motion	Greek	κινεῖν (kineîn), κίνησις (kínēsis), κίνημα (kínēma)	akinesia, akinesis, akinete, akinetic, cinema, cinematic, diakinesis, dyskinesia, dyskinetic, hyperkinesia, hyperkinesis, hyperkinetic, hypokinesia, hypokinesis, hypokinetic, kinematics, kinescope, kinesiologist, kinesiology, kinesis, kinesthetic, kinetic, kineticism, kinetics, kinetochore, kinetophobia, photokinesis, telekinesis
klept-	steal	Greek	κλέπτειν (kléptein), κλέπτης (kléptēs)	kleptocracy, kleptomania, kleptophobia, kleptoplasty
ktet-	possession, ownership	Greek	κτητικός (ktētikós), κτήτωρ (ktḗtōr)	ktetic, ktetor
kudo-	glory	Greek	κῦδος (kûdos)	kudos

Lists of Greek and Latin roots in English beginning with other letters:
- A
- B
- C
- D
- E
- F
- G
- H
- I
- J
- K
- L
- M
- N
- O
- P
- Q
- R
- S
- T
- U
- V
- X
- Z

== L ==
Root	Meaning in English	Origin language	Etymology (root origin)	English examples
lab-, lep-	grasp, seize, take	Greek	λαμβάνειν (lambánein), λῆψις (lêpsis), λῆμμα (lêmma)	analemma, analemmatic, analeptic, catalepsy, cataleptic, dilemma, dilemmatic, epilepsy, epileptic, hypnolepsy, hysteroepilepsy, metalepsis, narcolepsy, nympholepsy, octosyllabic, procatalepsis, prolepsis, proleptic, proslepsis, syllabic, syllabism, syllable, syllabogram, syllepsis, trisyllabic, trisyllable
lab-, laps-	slide, slip	Latin	labi, lapsus	collapse, collapsible, elapse, labile, lapse, prolapse, relapse
labi-	lip	Latin	labia, labiae	bilabial, bilabiate, infralabial, labial, labiate, labium, sublabial, supralabial
labor-	work	Latin	labor	collaborate, collaboration, collaborative, collaborator, elaborate, elaboration, elaborative, elaborator, labor, laboratory, laborious
lacer-	tear	Latin	lacer	laceration
lacrim-	cry, tears	Latin	lacrima	lachrymal, lachrymose, lachrymosity, lacrimal, lacrimation, lacrimator, lacrimatory, lacrimous
lact-	milk	Latin	lac, lactis, lactare	ablactate, ablactation, lactary, lactase, lactate, lactation, lactational, lacteal, lacteous, lactescent, lactic, lactose, laitance, latte
lag-	hare	Greek	λαγός (lagós)	lagomorph, Sylvilagus
lamin-	layer, slice	Latin	lāmina	bilamellate, bilaminar, lame, lamé, lamella, lamellar, lamellate, laminate, lamination, laminose, laminous, multilaminar, omelet, omelette, trilaminar, unilaminar
lamp-	shine, torch	Greek	λάμπειν (lámpein), λαμπάς (lampás)	lamp, lamprid, Lampris
lapid-	stone	Latin	lapis, lapidis	dilapidate, dilapidation, lapidarian, lapidary, lapidate, lapidation, lapidator, lapideous, lapidescence, lapidescent, lapidicolous, lapidification, lapillation, lapilli
larg-	large	Latin	largus	allargando, enlarge, enlargement, largamente, largando, large, largess, largesse, largition, largo
larv-	ghost, mask	Latin	larva	larva, larvae, larval
lat-	broad, wide	Latin	latus	laticlave, latifoliate, latifundium, latitude, latitudinal, latitudinarian, latitudinous
later-	side	Latin	latus, lateris	ambilateral, ambilaterality, bilateral, bilaterality, collateral, contralateral, equilateral, extralateral, inequilateral, ipsilateral, lateral, laterality, matrilateral, multilateral, nonlateral, patrilateral, plurilateral, quadrilateral, semilatus, septilateral, trilateral, unilateral
laud-, laus-	praise	Latin	laudare "to praise"	laud, laudable, laudanum, laudation, Lauds, summa cum laude
lav-	wash	Latin	lavare	launder, laundry, lava, lavation, lavatory, lave, lavender, lavish, lotion
lax-	not tense, slack	Latin	laxus, laxare	delay, disrelish, laches, lax, laxation, laxative, laxity, leasable, lease, relax, relaxant, relaxation, relay, release, relish, sublease
lecith-	egg yolk	Greek	λέκιθος (lékithos)	lecithin
led-, les-, -lid-, -lis-	hurt, strike	Latin	laedere, laesus, -lidere	allision, collide, collision, elide, elidible, elision, illesive, lesion
leg-	say	Greek	λέγειν (légein), λέγεσθαι (légesthai), λεκτός (lektós), λεκτικός (lektikós), λέξις (léxis), λεξικός (lexikós), λεξικόν (lexikón), λόγος (lógos), (logḗ), λεγόμενον (legómenon), λογεῖον	alexia, alexithymia, apologetic, apologia, apology, dialect, dialectic, dialectologist, dialectology, dialog, dialogue, dyslexia, dyslexic, dyslogia, dyslogism, ethnolect, legomenon, lexeme, lexicography, lexicology, lexicon, lexigram, lexis, logic, logion, logos, prolegomenon
leg-, lect-	choose, gather, read	Latin	legere	coil, colleague, collect, collectible, collection, collective, collector, college, collegial, collegiality, collegian, collegiate, collegium, counterintelligence, cull, deselect, diligence, diligent, elect, electability, electable, electee, election, elective, elector, electoral, electorate, eligibility, eligible, elite, illegibility, illegible, ineligibility, ineligible, intellect, intellection, intellectual, intellectuality, intelligence, intelligent, intelligentsia, intercollegiate, lectern, lectin, lection, lectionary, lector, lectorate, lecture, legend, legendary, legendry, legibility, legible, legion, legionary, legionnaire, legume, leguminous, lesson, neglect, negligee, negligence, negligent, negligible, nonelective, nonelite, nonnegligible, nonselective, postelection, predilect, predilection, preelection, prelect, prelection, prelector, preselect, recollect, recollection, reelect, reelection, religion, reselect, sacrilege, select, selectance, selectee, selection, selective, selectivity, selector, superselection, uniselector
leg-	law	Latin	lex, legis	allege, disloyal, disloyalty, extralegal, illegal, legal, legality, legific, legislate, legislation, legislative, legislator, legislature, legitim, legitimacy, legitimate, loyal, loyalty, nonlegal, privilege
leg-	send	Latin	legare (from legis)	allegation, delegable, delegacy, delegate, delegatee, delegation, delegator, delegatory, league, legacy, legatary, legate, legatee, legatine, legation, legato, nondelegate, relegate, relegation, superdelegate
lei-	smooth	Greek	λεῖος (leîos)	leiomyoma
lekan-, lanx-, lanc-	dish, pot	Greek, Latin	λεκάνη (lekánē lanx	balance, lekane, phalanx, valance
leni-	gentle	Latin	lenis, lenire	leniency, lenient, leniment, lenis, lenition, lenitive, lenitude, lenity
leon-	lion	Latin	leo, leonis	dandelion, Leo, leonine, Leopold
lep-	flake, peel, scale	Greek	λέπειν (lépein), λεπίς, λεπίδος (lepís, lepídos)	antilepton, lepidolite, Lepidoptera, Lepidorhombus, lepidote, lepidotrichia, leprosy
lepto-	small, fine, thin	Greek	λεπτός (leptós)	leptocyte, leptogenesis, Leptomonas, lepton, leptophyllous
leuc-, leuk-	white	Greek	λευκός (leukós)	aleukemia, aleukocytosis, leucism, leucocyte, leucopenia, leucoplast, leukemia, leukocytopenia, leukopenia, leucophore
lev-	lift, light, raise	Latin	levare "lighten, raise", from levis "light" (in weight)	alleviate, alleviation, bas-relief, counter-relief, deleverage, elevate, elevation, elevator, leaven, legerity, levade, Levant, levee, lever, leverage, leviable, levitate, levitation, levity, levy, relevé, relief, relieve, sublevation, superelevation
liber-	free	Latin	liber, liberare	deliver, deliverance, illiberal, illiberality, liberal, liberality, liberalize, liberate, liberation, liberator, libertarian, liberticide, libertinage, libertine, liberty, ultraliberal
libr-	book	Latin	liber, libri	interlibrary, libel, libellant, libellee, libellous, librarian, library, libretto
lig-	bind	Latin	ligare, ligatus	ligament, ligature
limac-	slug	Latin	limax, limacis	limacine, limacoid, limacon, Limax
limpa-	clear, water	Latin	limpa "water"	limpid, limpidity, lymph
line-	line	Latin	linea	align, alignment, ambilineal, ambilineality, bilinear, collinear, collinearity, collineation, curvilinear, curvilinearity, delineate, delineation, delineavit, line, linea, lineage, lineal, lineament, linear, linearity, lineate, lineation, matrilineal, multicollinearity, multilinear, nonalignment, noncollinear, nonlineal, nonlinear, nonlinearity, quasilinear, realign, realignment, rectilinear, rectilinearity, sesquilinear, sublineage, sublinear, supralinear, trilinear, unilinear
line-	smear, smudge	Latin	linere	delete, deletion, indelible, liniment
lingu-	language, tongue	Latin	lingua	bilingual, bilinguality, bilinguous, collingual, elinguation, interlanguage, language, ligula, ligular, ligule, lingua franca, lingual, linguiform, linguine, multilingual, prelingual, quadrilingual, sublingual, trilingual
linqu-, lict-	leave	Latin	linquere, lictus	relict, relinquish
lip-	fat	Greek	λίπος (lípos)	lipolysis, lipophile, lipophilic, lipopolysaccharide, lipoprotein, synaloepha
liqu-	flow	Latin	liquere	deliquesce, liquefy, liqueur, liquid, liquor, prolix
lit-	prayer, supplication	Greek	λιτή (litḗ), λιτανεία (litaneía)	litany
liter-	letter	Latin	littera	alliteration, alliterative, biliteral, biliterate, illiteracy, illiterate, literacy, literal, literary, literate, literati, literatim, literation, literator, literature, multiliteral, nonliteral, nonliterary, nonliterate, obliterate, obliteration, preliterate, quadriliteral, transliteracy, transliterate, transliteration, triliteral, uniliteral
lith-	stone	Greek	λίθος (líthos)	aerolithology, endolith, endolithic, epilithic, lithagogue, lithic, lithography, lithology, lithophile, lithophone, lithophyte, lithosphere, lithotomy, megalith, Mesolithic, microlite, monolith, monolithic, Neolithic, Paleolithic, photolithography, phytolith, regolith, stylolite
loc-	place	Latin	locus, locare	accouchement, allocate, bilocation, bilocular, cislocative, collocation, couch, couchant, dislocate, dislocation, interlocal, lieu, local, locale, locality, locate, location, locative, locator, locomotion, loculament, locular, locule, loculose, loculus, locus, milieu, multilocal, multilocation, multilocular, nonlocal, relocate, relocation, translocate, translocation, translocative, trilocular, unilocular
log-, -logy	word, reason, speech, thought	Greek	λόγος (lógos), λογία (logía)	analogy, anthology, apology, biology, dialogue doxology, ecology, epilogue, etymology, eulogy, geology, ideologue, logarithm, logic, logogram, logopaedics, logophile, logotherapy, meteorology, monologue, morphological, neologism, neurology, philology, prologue, psychology, tautology, terminology, theology, toxicology, trilogy, zoology
long-	long	Latin	longus	allonge, elongate, elongation, longa, longanimity, longe, longeron, longinquity, longitude, longitudinal, longum, lunge, lungo, oblong, prolong, prolongation, purloin
loqu-, locut-	speak	Latin	loqui	allocution, circumlocution, colloquial, colloquy, elocution, eloquent, eloquence, grandiloquent, interlocution, loquacious, loquacity, magniloquent, obloquy, soliloquy
luc-	bright, light	Latin	lūx (genitive lūcis), lucere	elucidate, elucidation, elucubrate, elucubration, lucent, lucid, lucidity, Lucifer (bearer of light), luciferase, luciferin, luciferous, lucifugal, lucubrate, lucubration, luculent, noctilucent, pellucid, pellucidity, relucent, semipellucid, translucency, translucent, translucid, translucidus
lud-, lus-	play	Latin	ludere, lusus	allude, collude, delude, elude, elusive, elusory, illude, illusion, ludicrous, lusory, prelude
lumin-	light	Latin	lumen, luminis, luminare	dislimn, enlumine, illuminable, illuminance, illuminant, illuminate, illuminati, illumination, illumine, intraluminal, limn, lumen, luminaire, luminal, luminance, luminant, luminaria, luminary, lumine, luminescence, luminescent, luminiferous, luminosity, luminous, relumine, subluminal, subluminous, superluminal, transluminal
lu-, luv-, lut-	wash	Latin	luere (see also diluere, fluere and pluere)	abluent, ablution, alluvium, colluvium, deluge, depollute, diluent, dilute, dilution, dilutive, diluvial, diluvian, diluvium, elute, elution, eluvial, elluviation, eluvium, illuviation, illuvium, lutaceous, lutite, pollution
lun-	moon	Latin	lūna	circumlunar, cislunar, demilune, luna, lunar, lunate, lunatic, lunation, lune, lunette, luniform, lunisolar, mezzaluna, mezzelune, plenilunary, semilunar, sublunar, sublunary, superlunary, translunar
lut-	yellow, golden	Latin	lūtum, lūteus	corpus luteum, luteal, lutein, luteinizing hormone, luteous
ly-, lysi-, lyt-	dissolving	Greek	λύειν (lúein), λυτός (lutós), λυτικός (lutikós), λύσις (lúsis)	analyse, analysis, analytic, aparalytic, autolysis, catalyse, catalysis, catalyst, catalytic, cytolysis, dialysis, electrolysis, electrolyte, electrolytic, Hippolyte, hydrolysis, hydrolyte, hydrolytic, lysigeny, lysine, lysis, lysosome, lytic, meta-analysis, palsy, paralyse, paralysis, paralytic, plasmolysis, proteolysis
lyc-	wolf	Greek	λύκος (lýkos)	Lycaon, lycanthropy, lycopersicon, lycoris

Lists of Greek and Latin roots in English beginning with other letters:
- A
- B
- C
- D
- E
- F
- G
- H
- I
- J
- K
- L
- M
- N
- O
- P
- Q
- R
- S
- T
- U
- V
- X
- Z

== M ==
Root	Meaning in English	Origin language	Etymology (root origin)	English examples
macer-	lean	Latin	macer	emaciate, macerate, meager
macr-	long	Greek	μακρός (makrós), μακρότης (makrótēs) "length"	macron, macrocosm
magn-	great, large	Latin	magnus	magnanimity, magnanimous, magnate, magnificent, magnify, magnitude, magnum
magnet-	lodestone	Greek	μάγνης, μάγνητος (mágnēs, mágnētos)	bioelectromagnetism, biomagnetism, diamagnetic, diamagnetism, electromagnet, geomagnetic, magnesium, magnet, magnetic, magnetism, magnetite, magnetize, magnetobiology, magnetologist, magnetometer, magnetosome, manganese, paramagnetic, paramagnetism
maj-	greater	Latin	major, majus	majesty, major, majority, majuscule, mayor, semimajor, supermajority
mal-	bad, wretched	Latin	malus	dismal, grand mal, malady, malaise, malediction, malefaction, malevolent, malfeasance, malfunction, malice, malicious, malignancy, malnourished, malodorous, premalignant
mamm-	breast	Latin	mamma	mammal, mammary, mammography
man-, mant- (ΜΑΝ)	crazy	Greek	μαίνεσθαι (maínesthai), μανία (manía), μανικός (manikós), μάντις	hypermania, hypomania, kleptomania, mania, maniac, manic, megalomania, monomania, pyromania, pyromaniac
man-	flow	Latin	mānāre, mānātus	emanant, emanate, emanation, immanant, immanation
man- (MAN-)	stay	Latin	manēre, mansus	immanence, immanent, impermanence, impermanent, maisonette, manor, manorial, manse, mansion, ménage, menagerie, menial, meiny, messuage, nonpermanence, nonpermanent, permanence, permanent, quasipermanent, remain, remainder, remanence, remanent, remnant, semipermanent
man-, manu-	hand	Latin	manus	adminicle, amanuensis, Bimana, bimanous, bimanual, emancipate, mainour, maintain, manacle, manage, manageable, management, managerial, mandamus, mandate, manège, maneuver, manicure, manifer, manifest, manifestation, manifesto, maniform, maniple, manipulation, manipulative, maniraptoran, maniraptoriform, manner, mansuetude, manual, manuary, manubrial, manubrium, manuduction, manufacture, manumission, manumit, manuport, manure, manus, manuscript, mortmain, Quadrumana, quadrumanous
mand-, -mend-	order, commit	Latin	mandāre, mandātus	command, commandant, commandment, commend, commendable, commendam, commendation, commendatory, counterdemand, countermand, demand, demandant, encomienda, mandamus, mandatary, mandate, mandator, mandatory, recommend, recommendation, remand, remandment
mar-	sea	Latin	mare, maris	maar, mariculture, marina, marinade, marinara, marinate, marination, marine, mariner, maritime, submarine, ultramarine
mas-	male, man	Latin	mās, māris, masculus, masculi	emasculate, emasculation, emasculator, masculate, masculine, masculinity
mater-, matr-	mother	Latin	mater, matris	maternal, maternity, matrimony, matrix, matron
maxim-	greatest	Latin	maximus	maxim, maximal, maximum, submaximal
mechan-	machine or instrument	Greek	μῆχος, μηχανή (mēkhanḗ), μηχανικός (mēkhanikós)	machine, mechane, mechanics, mechanism, mechanize, mechanobiology, mechanophilia, mechanophobia
medi-, -midi-	middle	Latin	medius, mediare	dimidiation, immediate, intermediary, mean, media, median, mediate, mediation, medieval, mediocre, Mediterranean, medium, moiety, multimedia, postmeridian, submediant
meg-, megal-	great, large	Greek	μέγας, μεγάλου (mégas, megálou)	acromegaly, Megacles, megacycle, megalomania, megalopolis, megaphone
mei-	less	Greek	μεῖον (meîon), μείωσις (meíōsis)	ameiosis, ameiotic, meiobenthos, meiosis, meiotic
melan-	black, dark	Greek	μέλας, μέλανος (mélas, mélanos), μελανότης	amelanism, aphaeomelanism, eumelanin, hypermelanic, melancholic, melancholy, Melanesia, melanin, melanism, melanoblastoma, melanocyte, melanoma, melanophobia, melanophore, melanosis, melatonin, neuromelanin, pheomelanin
melior-	better	Latin	meliorare "to improve", from melior "better"	ameliorate, amelioration, meliorism
meliss-	bee	Greek	μέλισσα (mélissa)	melissophobia
mell-	honey	Latin	mel, mellis	melliferous, mellific, mellifluence, mellifluent, mellifluous, melliloquent, mellivorous
memor-	remember	Latin	memor	commemorate, immemorial, memoir, memorabilia, memorable, memorandum, memorial, memory, remembrance
men-	month	Greek	μήν (mḗn)	menopause, menorrhea
mening-	membrane	Greek	μήνιγξ, μῆνιγγος (mēninx, mēningos)	leptomeninges, meninges, meningioma, meningitis, meninx
mend-	defect, fault	Latin	mendax "lying, a liar", from menda "defect, fault"	amend, amendment, emend, mendacious, mendacity
menstru-	monthly	Latin	menstruus	menstrual, menstruation
mensur-	measure	Latin	mensura "measurement", from metiri "to measure"	commensurable, commensurate, dimension, immense, incommensurable, incommensurate, measure
ment-	mind	Latin	mens, mentis	comment, dement, dementia, memento, mental, mentality, mention, reminisce, reminiscence
mer-	part	Greek	μείρεσθαι (meíresthai), μέρος (méros)	antimere, antimeria, biopolymer, decamer, decamerous, dimer, dimeric, dimerism, dimerous, enantiomer, enneamer, heptamer, heterodimer, heterotetramer, hexamer, homodimer, homotetramer, isomer, isomeric, isomerism, mereology, merisis, merism, meristem, meristematic, meristic, meromorphic, metamere, metamerism, Moirai, monomer, monomeric, octamer, oligomer, oligomeric, pentamer, pentamerous, photopolymer, phytomer, polymer, tautomerism, telomer, telomere, tetramer, tetrameric, trimer, trimerize
merc-	reward, wages, hire	Latin	merx (genitive mercis)	amercement, commerce, commercial, market, mercantile, mercenary, mercery, merchandise, merchant, mercy, noncommercial
merge-, mers-	dip, plunge	Latin	mergere	demerge, demersal, demerse, demersion, emerge, emergence, emergency, emergent, emersion, immerge, immergence, immerse, immersible, immersion, immersive, merge, reemerge, reemergence, reimmerse, submerge, submergence, submerse, submersible, submersion
mes-	middle	Greek	μέσος (mésos)	Mesolithic, mesophile, mesophilic, mesoscopic, mesosphere, mesozoic
met-, meta-	above, among, beyond	Greek	μετά (metá)	metabolism, metalogic, metamorphic, metamorphosis, metaphase, metaphor, metaphysics, metastatic, meteor, method
metall-	mine	Greek	μέταλλον (métallon), μεταλλικός (metallikós)	dimetallic, electrometallurgy, hydrometallurgy, metallic, metalloid, metallophobia, metallophone, metallurgist, metallurgy, organometallic, polymetal, polymetallic, pyrometallurgy, tetrametallic, trimetallic
meter-, metr-	measure	Greek	μέτρον (métron)	anemometer, anemometric, antisymmetric, antisymmetry, asymmetric, asymmetry, axonometric, barometer, barometric, bathometer, chronometer, diameter, diametric, dysmetria, graphometer, hexameter, hygrometer, hygrometry, isodiametric, isometric, isoperimetric, meter, metre, metric, metrology, metronome, monosymmetric, parameter, parameterize, parametric, parametrize, pentameter, perimeter, polymeter, symmetric, symmetry, telemeter, telemetric, telemetry, tetrameter, thermometer, trimeter, trimetric
metr-	mother	Greek	μήτηρ, μητρός (mḗtēr, mētrós), μητρικός (mētrikós)	haplometrosis, metrocyte, metropolis, pleometrosis
mic-	grain	Latin	mica	mica, micelle
micr-	small	Greek	μικρός (mikrós), μικρότης	microbe, microcosm, microeconomics, micrometer, microphone, microscope, microscopic
migr-	wander	Latin	migrare	countermigration, emigrant, emigrate, emigration, émigré, immigrant, immigrate, immigration, migrant, migrate, migration, migrational, migratory, nonmigratory, remigrant, remigrate, remigration, transmigrant, transmigrate, transmigration, transmigratory
milit-	soldier	Latin	mīles, militis	militant, military, militia
mill-	thousand	Latin	mille	mile, millennium, million
millen-	thousand each	Latin	milleni	millenarian, millenary
mim-	repeat	Greek	μιμεῖσθαι (mimeîsthai), μιμητικός (mimētikós), μίμος (mímos)	mime, mimeograph, mimesis, mimetic, mimic, necromimesis, pantomime, phenomime, psychomime, psychomimetic
min-	jut	Latin	minere	eminence, eminent, imminence, imminent, preeminence, preeminent, prominence, prominent, promontory, supereminence, supereminent
min-	less, smaller	Latin	minor, minus	administer, administration, administrative, administrator, administratrix, maladminister, maladministration, minestrone, minister, ministerial, ministerialis, ministerium, ministrant, ministrate, ministration, ministrative, ministry, minor, minority, minstrel, minstrelsy, minus, minuscule, quasiminuscule, semiminor
mina-	lead	Latin	minare, variant of minari	amenable, demeanor, promenade
mina-	threaten	Latin	minari	menace, minatory
minth-	mint	Greek	μίνθα (míntha), μίνθη (mínthē), μινθάριον	Acanthomintha, Mentha, menthol, mint, Minthostachys
mir-	wonder, amazement	Latin	mirus, miror, mirari, miratus sum	admirability, admirable, admiration, admirative, admire, marvel, marvelous, miracle, miraculous, mirage, Miranda, mirative, mirativity, mirror
mis-	hate	Greek	μισεῖν (miseîn), μῖσος (mîsos)	misandrist, misandry, misanthrope, misanthropy, misocainea, misogamist, misogamy, misogynist, misogyny, misoneism, misopaedia, misophonia, misotheism
misc-, mixt-	mix	Latin	miscere, mixtus	admix, admixtion, admixture, commix, commixture, immiscibility, immiscible, immix, immixture, intermix, intermixture, maslin, meddle, mestizo, Métis, miscellanea, miscellaneous, miscellany, miscibility, miscible, mix, mixture, permiscible, permix, permixtion, postmix, premix, promiscuity, promiscuous, remix
miser-	unhappy, wretched	Latin	miser	commiserate, commiseration, immiserate, immiseration, miser, miserable, misericord, misery
mit-, miss- (MIT-)	send	Latin	mittere, missus	admissibility, admissible, admission, admissive, admit, admittatur, admittee, commissar, commissariat, commissary, commission, commissive, commissural, commissure, commit, commitment, committal, committee, compromis, compromise, compromissary, decommission, decommit, decommitment, demise, demiss, demit, dimissory, dimit, dismiss, dismissal, dismissive, emissary, emission, emissitious, emissive, emissivity, emit, emittent, entremet, fideicommissary, fideicommissum, impermissible, inadmissibility, inadmissible, intermission, intermittent, intromissible, intromission, intromissive, intromit, intromittent, manumission, manumit, mess, message, messenger, missile, mission, missionary, missive, mittimus, noncommittal, omissible, omission, omissive, omit, permissible, permission, permissive, permissory, permit, permittee, premise, premiss, premit, pretermission, pretermit, promise, promisee, promissive, promissory, readmission, readmit, recommit, remise, remiss, remissible, remission, remissive, remissory, remit, remittal, remittance, remittee, remittence, remittent, remittitur, resubmit, retransmission, retransmit, subcommittee, submission, submissive, submit, surmise, transmissibility, transmissible, transmission, transmissive, transmit, transmittal
mit-	thread	Greek	μίτος (mítos)	mitochondrion, mitosis, mitospore
mn-		Greek	μνᾶ (mnâ)	mina, mna
mne-	memory	Greek	μνᾶσθαι (mnâsthai), μνήμη (mnḗmē)	amnesia, amnesty, anamnesis, anamnestic, dysmnesia, Mneme, mneme, mnemonic
mod-	measure, change	Latin	modus "measure"	accommodate, accommodation, accommodative, accommodator, bimodal, bimodality, bimodular, bimodule, commode, commodification, commodious, commodity, decommodification, demodulate, demodulation, demodulator, immodest, immodesty, intermodal, intermodulation, modal, modality, mode, model, moderate, moderation, moderato, moderator, modern, modernity, modest, modesty, modicum, modification, modify, modiolus, modular, modularity, modulate, modulation, modulator, module, modulo, modulus, multimodal, multimodality, postmodern, postmodernity, Quasimodo, remodel, remodulate, supermodel, trimodal, trimodality, ultramodern, ultramodernity, unimodal, unimodality, unimodular, unimodularity
mol-	grind	Latin	mola, molere, molitus	demolition, molar
moll-	soft	Latin	mollis	emollience, emollient, moil, mollescence, mollescent, mollient, mollification, mollify, mollitude, mollusc, molluscicide, molluscivore, mollusk
mon-	alone, only	Greek	μόνος (mónos), μονάς, μονάδος (monás, monádos)	monachism, monad, monadic, monarchy, monastery, monastic, monasticism, monatomic, monism, monist, monk, monoid, monolith, monometer, monopod, monopoly, monopsony, monotone
mon-	warn	Latin	monere, monitus	admonish, admonishment, admonition, admonitor, admonitory, monition, monitor, monitory, monument, monumental, premonition, premonitory, resummon, summon
monil-	string of beads	Latin	monile	monilifer, moniliform, Moniliformida
monstra-	show	Latin	monstrāre	counterdemonstration, counterdemonstrator, demonstrable, demonstrant, demonstrate, demonstration, demonstrative, demonstrator, demonstratory, indemonstrable, monster, monstrance, monstration, monstrosity, monstrous, muster, premonstrant, premonstrate, Premonstratensian, premonstration, premonstrator, remonstrance, remonstrant, remonstrate, remonstration, remonstrative
mont-	mountain	Latin	mons, montis	amount, Belmont, cismontane, dismount, insurmountable, intermontane, montage, montan, Montana, montane, montant, monticello, monticule, montiform, montigenous, mount, mountaineer, mountainous, nonremontant, paramount, piedmont, remontancy, remontant, remontoire, remount, submontane, surmount, surmountable, tantamount, tramontana, tramontane, transmontane, ultramontane, Vermont
mor-	foolish, dull	Greek	μωρός (mōrós)	moron, moronic, oxymoron, oxymoronic, sophomore, sophomoric
mor-	pause, delay	Latin	morari "to delay", from mora "a pause, delay"	demur, demure, demurrable, demurrage, demurral, demurrer, mora, moratorium, remora, remorate
mor-	custom, disposition	Latin	mos, moris	immoral, immorality, moral, morale, morality, mores, morigerous, morose, morosity
mord-	bite	Latin	mordere, morsus	mordacious, mordacity, mordancy, mordant, mordent, mordente, mordicancy, mordicant, mordication, mordicative, morsel, morsitation, premorse, remorse
morph-	form, shape	Greek	μορφή (morphḗ)	allomorph, amorphous, anamorph, anamorphic, anamorphism, anamorphosis, anthropomorphism, apomorphy, autapomorphy, automorphism, catamorphism, dimorphic, dimorphism, dysmorphic, dysmorphophobia, ectomorph, ectomorphic, enantiomorph, enantiomorphic, endomorph, endomorphic, epimorphism, geomorphology, hemimorphic, holomorph, holomorphic, holomorphism, homeomorphic, homeomorphism, homomorphic, homomorphism, hylomorphism, hypermorphosis, isomorphic, isomorphism, mesomorph, mesomorphic, metamorphic, metamorphism, metamorphosis, monomorphic, monomorphism, morpheme, Morpheus, morphine, morphology, morphosyntactic, morphosyntax, paramorph, peramorphism, peramorphosis, perimorph, plesiomorphy, polymorphic, polymorphism, pseudomorph, synapomorphy, teleomorph, teleomorphic, theriomorphic, trimorphic, trimorphism, zoomorph, zoomorphism
mort-	death	Latin	mors, mortis	antemortem, immortal, immortality, mortal, mortality, mortician, mortiferous, mortification, mortuary
mov-, mot-, mut-	move, motion	Latin	movere, motus	admove, amotion, amove, bimotor, cocommutator, commotion, commove, commutable, commutation, commutative, commutativity, commutator, commute, countermotion, countermove, countermovement, demote, demotion, emotion, emotional, emotive, emotivity, emove, equimomental, immobile, immutable, immutation, immute, incommutable, locomotion, locomotive, mobile, mobility, molt, moment, momental, momentaneous, momentary, momentous, momentum, motation, motif, motile, motility, motion, motional, motivate, motivation, motivational, motivator, motive, motor, moult, movant, move, movement, movent, mutability, mutable, mutate, mutation, mutineer, mutinous, mutiny, mutual, mutuality, noncommutative, noncommutativity, nonmotile, nonmotility, nonmutual, pari-mutuel, permutable, permutate, permutation, permutational, permute, promote, promotion, promotional, promotive, promotor, promove, remote, remotion, removal, remove, subpermutation, transmove, transmutable, transmutate, transmutation, transmute, transmutual, trimotor
mulg-, muls-	milk	Latin	mulgere	emulsion
multi-	many, much	Latin	multus	multilingual, multiple, multiplex, multiplication, multiplicity, multiply, multitude, multitudinous
mund-	world	Latin	mundus	anima mundi, antemundane, demimondaine, demimonde, extramundane, intramundane, map, mondain, mondaine, mondial, mondo, mundane, mundanity, ultramundane
mur-	wall	Latin	mūrus, muri	antemural, immuration, immure, immurement, intramural, murage, mural
mus-	mouse	Greek/Latin	μῦς, μυός (mûs, muós) / mus, muris	musophobia
musc-	fly	Latin	musca, muscae	Musca, muscarine, Muscicapa, Muscicapidae, Muscidae, musciform, mosquito
mut-	change	Latin	mūtare	immutable, mutation, permutation, transmute
my-	mouse	Greek	μῦς, μυός (mûs, muós), μυών	amyotrophic, electromyogram, electromyograph, electromyography, endomysium, epimysium, murine, musophobia, myoelectric, myomancy, myomorphous, myomorphy, myopathy, myositis, myotome, Nectomys, Oryzomys, perimysium, Sigmodontomys
my-	shut (the eyes)	Greek	μύειν (múein), μύσις (músis), μύστης (mústēs)	miosis, myopia, myopic, myosis, mystery
mycet-	fungus	Greek	μύκης, μύκητος (múkēs, múkētos)	ascomycete, basidiomycete, mycology, Mycoplasma, zygomycete, zygomycosis
mydr-	dilate	Greek	μύδρος, μυδρίασις (mudríasis)	mydriasis
myel-	marrow	Greek	μυελός (muelós)	amyelia, myeloblast, myelocyte, myelogenous, myeloid, myelopoiesis, poliomyelitis
myl-	mill	Greek	μύλη (múlē), μύλος (múlos)	amyloid, amyloidosis, amylolysis, amylopectin, amylophagia, amyloplast, amylose, amylum
myo-	muscle	Greek	μυς (mys)	leiomyoma
myri-	countless, ten thousand	Greek	μυρίος (muríos)	myriad, myriagon, myriagram, myriapod, myriapodology
myrmec-	ant	Greek	μύρμηξ (múrmēx)	myrmecochory, myrmecoid, myrmecology, myrmecophobia, Myrmidons, myrmomancy
mys-	uncleanness	Greek	μύσος (músos)	mysophilia, mysophobia
myth-	story	Greek	μῦθος (mûthos)	mythic, mythology, mythomania, mythopoeia, mythos
myx-	slime	Greek	μύσσομαι, μύξα (múxa)	match, myxedema, myxoedema, Myxini, myxogastrid
myz-	suck	Greek	μυζάω (muzáō), μύζησις (múzēsis)	Myzopoda

Lists of Greek and Latin roots in English beginning with other letters:
- A
- B
- C
- D
- E
- F
- G
- H
- I
- J
- K
- L
- M
- N
- O
- P
- Q
- R
- S
- T
- U
- V
- X
- Z

== N ==
Root	Meaning in English	Origin language	Etymology (root origin)	English examples
nap-	turnip	Latin	nāpus	napiform, neep
nar-	nostril	Latin	naris	internarial, nares, narial, naris, prenarial
narc-	numb	Greek	ναρκᾶν (narkân), νάρκη (nárkē)	narcolepsy, narcosis, narcotic
narr-	tell	Latin	narrare	counternarrative, inenarrable, narration, narrative, narrator
nas-	nose	Latin	nāsus	intranasal, nasal, nasalance, nasalis, nasality, nasolabial, nonnasal
nasc-, nat-	born	Latin	nascere, nāsci (past participle natus)	adnascent, adnate, adnation, agnate, agnatic, agnation, binational, cognate, cognatic, cognation, connascence, connascent, connate, connation, connatural, denature, enascent, enate, enatic, enation, impregnate, innate, international, multinational, nada, naïf, naissant, naïve, nascency, nascent, natal, natality, nation, national, nationality, native, nativity, natural, naturality, nature, née, nonnative, postnatal, pregnancy, pregnant, prenatal, preternatural, renaissance, renaissant, renascence, renascent, renature, subnational, supernatural, supranational, transnational, transnationality
naut-	ship	Greek	ναῦς (naûs), ναύτης (naútēs)	aeronautic, Argonaut, astronaut, cosmonaut, nausea, nautical, nautilus
nav-	ship	Latin	nāvis	antenave, naval, nave, navicular, navigable, navigate, navy, nonnavigable
ne-	spin, thread	Greek	νεῖν (neîn), νῆσις "spinning", νῆμα, νήματος (nêma, nḗmatos)	axoneme, diplonema, leptonema, nematocyst, nematocyte, nematode, nematology, pachynema, synnema, treponema, zygonema
ne-, neo-	new	Greek	νέϝος, νέος (néos)	Neolithic, neologism, neon, neonate, neophyte
neb-, nub-	cloud	Latin	nebula, nubes	nebula, nebular, nebulosity, nebulous, nuance, nubilous, obnubilate
necr-	dead	Greek	νεκρός (nekrós), νέκρωσις (nékrōsis)	necromancy, Necronomicon, necrophilia, necrophobia, necropolis, necropsy, necrosis, necrospermia, necrotic, necrotize, necrotomy
nect-	swimming	Greek	νηκτός (nēktós)	nectopod, nekton
nect-, nex-	join, tie	Latin	nectere, nexus	adnexum, annectent, annex, annexation, annexion, connect, connexion, deannexation, disconnect, interconnect, nexus, reconnect
neg-	say no	Latin	negare	negative, renegade, renege
nem-, nom-	arrangement, law	Greek	νέμειν (némein), νομός (nomós), νόμος (nómos), νέμεσις (némesis), νομάς, νομάδος (nomás, nomádos), νομαδικός (nomadikós), νομαδία, νομή, νομίζειν (nomízein), νόμισμα (nómisma)	anomie, anomy, antinome, antinomic, antinomy, archnemesis, autonomy, isonomy, metronomic, nemesis, nomad, nomadic, nomadism, nomadize, nomarch, nomarchy, nome, nomology, nomothetic, Numidia, numismatics
nemat-	hair	Greek	νῆμα, νήματος (nêma, nḗmatos)	nematocyst, nematocyte, nematode, nematology
nemor-	grove, woods	Latin	nemus, nemoris	nemoral, nemorous
nephr-	kidney	Greek	νεφρός (nephrós)	mesonephric, mesonephros, metanephridium, metanephros, nephridiopore, nephridium, nephrite, nephritis, nephrogenesis, nephrolith, nephrolithiasis, nephrologist, nephrology, nephron, nephroptosis, nephrostome, pronephros, protonephridium
nerv-	sinew, nerve	Latin	nervus	enervate, enervation, enervative, innervate, innervation, nerval, nervate, nerve, nervose, nervosity, nervous, reinnervation, trinervate
nes-	island	Greek	νῆσος (nêsos)	Chersonesus, Indonesia, Melanesia, Micronesia, Peloponnese, Polynesia
neur-	nerve, sinew	Greek	νεῦρον (neûron)	aponeurosis, endoneurium, epineurium, neural, neurapraxia, neurasthenia, neuritis, neuroblast, neuroblastoma, neurocranium, neurocyte, neuroendocrine, neuroendocrinology, neurologic, neurologist, neurology, neuromorphology, neuron, neurone, neuropathic, neuropathology, neuropathy, neuroplastic, neurosis, neurosurgeon, neurosurgery, neurotic, neuroticism, perineurium, polyneuropathy
nict-	beckon, wink	Latin	nictari	nictate, nictation, nictitate, nictitation
nigr-	black	Latin	niger	denigrate, denigration, denigrative, denigrator, negrita, nigrities, negrito, negritude, nigrescence, nigrescent, nigrine, nigritude
nihil-	nothing	Latin	nihilum	annihilate, annihilation, annihilator, nihil, nil
niv-	snow	Latin	nix, nivis	Nevada, névé, nival, nivation, niveus, subnival, subnivean
noc-	hurt, harm	Latin	nocere	innocence, innocent, innocuity, innocuous, innoxious, nocebo, nocent, nociception, nociceptive, nocifensor, nocument, nocuous, noxious, nuisance, obnoxious
noct-	night	Latin	nox (noctis)	equinoctial, equinox, noctambulous, noctiluca, noctilucent, noctule, nocturn, nocturnal, nocturnality, nocturne, notturno, seminocturnal, trinoctial
nod-	knot	Latin	nodus	acnode, binodal, crunode, denouement, extranodal, internodal, internode, intranodal, multinodal, nodal, node, nodose, nodosity, nodular, nodulation, nodule, nodulose, nodulus, nodus, supernode, tacnode, trinodal, uninodal
nom-	arrangement, law, order	Greek	νόμος (nómos), νομή	agronomy, antinomy, astronomy, autonomous, autonomy, bionomics, economics, economy, gastronomy, metronome, numismatic, polynomial, taxonomy
nomad-	those who let pasture herds	Greek	νομάς, νομάδος (nomás, nomádos), νομαδικός (nomadikós)	nomad, nomadic, nomadism, nomadize
nomen-, nomin-	name	Latin	nomen, nominis	agnomen, agnominal, agnomination, binomen, binominal, denomination, denominational, denominative, denominator, ignominious, ignominy, innominate, innomine, interdenominational, multidenominational, multinominal, nomenclator, nomenclature, nominal, nominate, nomination, nominative, nominator, nominee, nondenominational, noun, postnominal, praenomen, prenominal, pronominal, pronoun, redenomination, renominate, renown, surnominal, trinomen, trinominal
non-	not	Latin	non	none, nonexistent, non-fiction, noninvasive
non-	ninth	Latin	nōnus	nonary, None, nonet, noon
nonagen-	ninety each	Latin	nonageni	nonagenarian, nonagenary
nonagesim-	ninetieth	Latin	nonagesimus	nonagesimal
norm-	carpenter's square	Latin	norma	abnormal, abnormality, binormal, circumnormal, denormal, enormity, enormous, nonnormal, nonnormative, norm, normable, normal, normality, normative, quasinorm, seminorm, seminormable, seminormal, subnormal
not-	south	Greek	νότος (nótos)	Notogaea, Notomys, Nototherium
not-	back	Greek	νῶτον (nôton), νῶτος, νωτιαῖος	notochord
not-	letter, mark, note	Latin	notare	annotate, annotation, annotator, connotation, connotational, connotative, connote, denotation, denotational, denotative, denotatum, denote, nondenotative, nonnotable, nonnotational, notability, notable, notarial, notariat, notary, notate, notation, notational
noth-	spurious	Greek	νόθος (nóthos)	nothogenus
nov-, nome-, non-, novem-	nine	Latin	novem	November, novennial, Nonillion, Nomedecillion
nov-	new	Latin	novus	innovate, innovation, innovational, innovative, innovator, innovatory, nova, novation, novel, novella, novelty, novice, novitiate, renovatable, renovate, renovation, renovative, renovator, supernova
noven-	nine each	Latin	noveni	Novena, novenary
novendec-	nineteen	Latin	novendecim	novemdecillion
nox-	harm	Latin	noxa	noxious, obnoxious
nu-	nod	Latin	nuere	circumnutate, circumnutation, counternutation, innuendo, innuent, numen, numinous, nutant, nutation
nub-, nupt-	to marry, to wed	Latin	nubes, nubis, nubere	connubial, connubiality, nubile, nuptial, postnuptial, prenuptial
nuc-	nut	Latin	nux, nucis	enucleate, enucleation, extranuclear, internuclear, intranuclear, multinucleate, nougat, nucament, nucellar, nucellus, nucifer, nuciferine, nuciferous, nuciform, Nucifraga, nucivorous, nuclear, nucleate, nucleation, nucleolar, nucleolate, nucleolus, nucleus, pronuclear, pronucleus, supranuclear
nuch-	back of neck	Latin	nucha	nuchal cord
nud-	naked	Latin	nudus	denudation, denude, nonnude, nude, nudist, nudity, seminude, seminudity
null-	none	Latin	nullus	nullify
numer-	number	Latin	numerus	denumerable, enumerable, enumerate, enumeration, enumerative, enumerator, equinumerant, equinumerous, innumerable, innumeracy, innumerate, innumerous, nonenumerative, numerable, numeracy, numéraire, numeral, numerary, numerate, numeration, numerative, numerator, numerical, numero, numerosity, numerous, renumerate, supernumerary
nunci-	announce	Latin	nuntius	announce, announcement, annunciation, denounce, denouncement, denunciation, enounce, enouncement, enunciable, enunciate, enunciation, enunciative, internuncial, internuncio, nunciature, nuncio, obnounce, pronounce, pronouncement, pronunciation, pronuntiatio, renounce, renouncement, renunciation
nutri-	nourish	Latin	nutrire	innutrition, malnourish, malnourishment, malnutrition, nonnutritional, nourish, nourishment, nurse, nurturance, nurture, nutrient, nutriment, nutrition, nutritional, nutritious
nyct-	night	Greek	νύξ, νυκτός (núx, nuktós)	nyctalgia, nyctanthous, nyctinasty, nyctophilia, nyctophobia
nyst-	nod	Greek	νυστάζειν (nustázein), (nustagmós)	electronystagmography, nystagmic, nystagmus

Lists of Greek and Latin roots in English beginning with other letters:
- A
- B
- C
- D
- E
- F
- G
- H
- I
- J
- K
- L
- M
- N
- O
- P
- Q
- R
- S
- T
- U
- V
- X
- Z

== O ==
Root	Meaning in English	Origin language	Etymology (root origin)	English examples
ob-, o-, oc-, of-, og-, op-, os-	against	Latin	ob	obduracy, obdurate, obduration, obfuscate, oblique, obliquity, obstinate, obstreperous, occur, offend, omit, oppose, ostensible, ostentatious
obel-	spit, nail	Greek	ὀβελός (obelós), ὀβελίσκος (obelískos)	metobelus, obelisk, obelism, obelus
obol-	nail	Greek	ὀβολός, ὀβολοῦ (obolós, oboloû)	obol, obolus
ocean-	river, stream	Greek	ὠκεανός (ōkeanós)	Oceania, oceanic
ochl-	crowd, mob	Greek	ὄχλος, ὄχλου (ókhlos, ókhlou)	enochlophobia, ochlocracy, ochlophobia
oct-	eight	Greek	ὀκτώ (oktṓ), ὀκτάς (oktás), ὀκτάκις (oktákis) "eight times"	hemi-octahedron, octad, octadic, octagon, octahedron, octameter, octode
oct-	eight	Latin	octō	octangular, octennial, octovir
octav-	eighth	Latin	octāvus	octaval
octogen-	eighty each	Latin	octogeni	octogenarian, octogenary
octogesim-	eightieth	Latin	octogesimus	octogesimal
octon-	eight each	Latin	octoni	octonary
ocul-	eye	Latin	oculus, oculare	ocular, oculus, ullage
od-	path, way	Greek	ὁδός (hodós)	anode, diode, odometer, parodos, pentode, tetrode, triode
odi-	hate	Latin	odium	odious
odont-	tooth	Greek	ὀδούς, ὀδόντος (odoús, odóntos)	anodontia, conodont, cynodont, dicynodont, dysodontiasis, macrodontia, mastodon, odontoid, odontology, odontophore, orthodontics, orthodontist, pedodontics, periodontal, smilodon, Thrinaxodon, Zanclodon
odor-	fragrant	Latin	odor	malodorous, odoriferous, odorous
odyn-	pain	Greek	ὀδύνη (odúnē)	allodynia, anodyne, glossodynia, mastodynia, pleurodynia
oec-	house	Greek	ϝοῖκος (woîkos), οἶκος (oîkos)	andromonecy, archdiocese, autoecious, autoecism, dioecious, dioecy, ecesis, ecologist, ecology, economics, economist, economize, economy, ecoregion, ecosystem, ecumenic, ecumenism, gynomonoecy, heteroecious, heteroecism, heteroecy, homoecious, monoecious, monoecy, oecology, oeconomus, oecumenic, oikology, oikophobia, palaeoecology, paleoecology, parish, paroecious, perioeci, trioecious
oed-, ed-	swell, swollen	Greek	οἶδος (oîdos), οἰδεῖν (oideîn), οἴδημα, οἴδηματος (oídēma, oídēmatos)	angioedema, edema, edematous, oedema, oedematous
oen-	wine	Greek	ϝοῖνος (woînos), οἶνος (oînos)	enology, oenochoe, oenologist, oenology, oenophile, oenophilia, oinochoe
oesophag-	gullet	Greek	οἰσοφάγος (oisophágos)	oesophagectomy, oesophagitis, oesophagus
oestr-	gadfly, sting	Greek	οἶστρος (oîstros), οἰστράω, οἴστρησις, οἴστρημα	anestrous, anestrus, anoestrus, estrogen, estrogenic, estrus, oestrone, oestrus
ogdo-	eighth	Greek	ὄγδοος (ógdoos), ὀγδοάς, ὀγδοάδος (ogdoás, ogdoádos)	ogdoad
-oid	like	Greek	-οειδής (-oeidēs)	asteroid, mucoid, organoid
ole-	oil	Latin	oleum	oleosity
olecran-	skull of elbow	Latin from Greek	ὠλέκρανον (ōlékranon)	olecranon
olig-	few	Greek	ὀλίγος (olígos)	oligarchy, Oligocene, oligopoly, oligosaccharide, oligotrophic
oliv-	olive	Latin	oliva	olivaceous, olivary, olivette
om-	raw	Greek	ὠμός (ōmós), ὠμότης (ōmótēs) "rawness"	omophagia, Omophagus
om-	shoulder	Greek	ὦμος (ômos), ὠμία (ōmía)	acromion, omohyoid, omophorion
-oma	morbid growth, tumor	Greek	-ωμα	melanoma
omas-	paunch	Latin	omasum	abomasum, omasum
ombr-	rain	Greek	ὄμβρος (ómbros)	ombrogenous, ombrology, ombrometer, Ombrophila, ombrophilous, ombrophobe, ombrotrophic
oment-	fat skin	Latin	omentum	omental
omin-	creepy	Latin	omen, ominis	abominable, ominous
ommat-	eye	Greek	ὁράω, ὦμμαι, ὄμμα, ὄμματος (ómma, ómmatos)	ommatidium, ommatophore
omni-	all	Latin	omnis	omnipotence, omnipresent, omniscient, omnivore
omphal-	navel	Greek	ὀμφαλός (omphalós)	omphalectomy, omphalic, omphalopagus, omphalophobia, paromphalocele
on-	ass	Greek	ὄνος (ónos), ὀνίσκος (onískos)	Oniscidea, Oniscomorpha
onc-	barb, hook	Greek	ὄγκος, ὄγκινος (ónkinos)	Oncinocalyx, Oncorhynchus
onc- (ΕΓΚ)	bulk	Greek	ἐνεγκεῖν, ὄγκος (ónkos), ὀγκόω, ὀγκωτός, ὄγκωσις, ὄγκωμα	oncocyte, oncocytoma, oncogenesis, oncologist, oncology
oneir-	dream	Greek	ὄνειρος (óneiros), ὀνειρώσσω, ὀνείρωξις (oneírōxis)	oneiric, oneirism, oneirocritic, Oneirocritica, Oneirodidae, oneirogen, oneirogenic, Oneiroi, oneiroid, oneirology, oneiromancy, oneironaut, oneironautics, oneirophobia, oneirophrenia, oneiroscopy
oner-	burden, load	Latin	onus, oneris	exonerate, exoneration, onerous, onus
oni-	price	Greek	ὦνος (ônos), ὤνιος (ṓnios)	oniochalasia, oniomania, oniomaniac
onomat-	name	Greek	ὄνομα, ὀνόματος (ónoma, onómatos), ὀνομάζω, ὀνομαστικός (onomastikós)	antonomasia, onomasiology, onomastic, onomasticon, onomastics, onomasty, onomatology, onomatophore, onomatopoeia
ont-	being, existence	Greek	ὄντος, ὀντότης (óntos, ontótēs), οὐσία (ousía)	dysontogenesis, homoiousia, homoousia, monoousious, ontogenesis, ontogenetic, ontogeny, ontology, ousia, parousia
onych-	claw	Greek	ὄνυξ, ὄνυχος (ónux, ónukhos), ὀνύχιον (onúkhion), ὀνύχινος, ὀνυχίζω	hapalonychia, Mesonychia, onychectomy, onycholysis, onychomancy, onychomycosis, onychophagia, onychophagy, onychorrhexis, onyx, paronychia, sardonyx
onym-	name	Greek	ὄνυμα (ónuma)	acronym, allonym, anonymous, antonym, autonym, caconym, cryptonym, eponym, eponymous, eponymy, euonym, homonym, hyperonym, hyponym, hyponymy, meronym, meronymy, metonym, metonymy, metronymic, paronym, paronymous, pseudonym, pseudonymous, synonym, synonymous, synonymy, tautonym, tautonymous, tautonymy, troponym, troponymy, xenonym, xenonymy
oo-	egg	Greek	ᾠόν (ōión)	bottarga, dioon, epoophoron, oidioid, oidium, ooblast, oocyst, oocyte, oocytogenesis, oogamete, oogamous, oogamy, oogenesis, oogonium, ooid, oolite, oolith, oology, oomancy, oophagy, oophorectomy, oophoron, ootheca, ootid, ootidogenesis, paroophoron
op-	hole	Greek	ὀπή (opḗ), ὀπαῖον (opaîon)	metope, opaion
opac-	shady	Latin	opacus	opacity, opacus, opaque
oper-	work	Latin	opus, operis	cooperate, inoperable, opera, operate, opus
oper-	cover	Latin	operire, operculum	interoperculum, kerchief, opercular, operculiform, operculum
ophi-	snake	Greek	ὄφις, ὄφεως (óphis, ópheōs)	Brachyurophis, ophicephalous, Ophicephalus, Ophiceras, Ophiclinus, ophidiophobia, ophiolite, ophiologist, ophiology, ophiophagous, Ophiophagus, ophiophagy, ophiophobia, Ophisaurus, Ophisops, ophitic
ophthalm-	eye	Greek	ὀφθαλμός (ophthalmós)	exophthalmic, exophthalmos, microphthalmia, ophthalmia, ophthalmic, ophthalmologic, ophthalmologist, ophthalmology, ophthalmoparesis, ophthalmoplegia, parophthalmia, xerophthalmia
opisth-	behind	Greek	ὄπισθεν (ópisthen), ὀπίσθιος	anopisthograph, opisthion, opisthobranch, opisthodomos, opisthoglyphous, opisthognathous, opisthograph, opisthokont, opisthosoma, opsimath, opsimathy
ops-, opt- (ΟΠ)	eye	Greek	ὄψεσθαι (ópsesthai), ὀπτός (optós), ὀπτικός (optikós), ὄψις (ópsis)	amblyopia, anopia, autopsy, biopsy, catadioptrics, catoptrics, catoptromancy, catoptrophobia, cyclops, diopter, dioptre, dioptrics, diplopia, eisoptrophobia, emmetropia, hemianopsia, myopia, opsoclonus, optic, optokinetic, panopticon, pleoptics, synopsis, synoptic, tritanopia
opsi-	late	Greek	ὀψέ (opsé), ὄψιος	opsimath
opson-	cook, prepare for eating	Greek	ὀψωνεῖν (opsōneîn), (opsōnia)	opsonin, opsonoid
opt-	choose	Latin	optare	adopt, adoptee, adoption, adoptive, co-option, coopt, cooptation, nonoptional, opt, optation, optative, option, optional, optionality
optim-	best	Latin	optimus	optimal, optimum
or-, oro-	mountain	Greek	ὄρος, ὄρεος (óros, óreos), ὀρειάς	Oread, orogenesis, orogenic, orogeny, orographic, orography, oronym
or-	mouth	Latin	os (genitive oris) "mouth"	adosculation, inosculate, inosculation, interosculate, intraoral, oral, orifice, osculant, osculum, peroral
ora-	pray, plead	Latin	orare "to pray, plead"	adore, adoration, exorable, inexorable, oracle, orate, oration, orator, oratorio, oratory, orison, perorate, peroration, perorator
orb-	circle	Latin	orbis	orbit
orch-	testicle	Greek	ὄρχις (órkhis), ὀρχίδιον (orkhídion)	anorchia, cryptorchidism, monorchism, orchid, orchiectomy, orchiopexy, Orchis, polyorchidism
orches-	dance	Greek	ὀρχεῖσθαι (orkheîsthai)	orchestra
ordin-	order	Latin	ōrdō, ordinis	coordinal, coordinate, coordination, coordinator, disorder, extraordinaire, extraordinary, grandorder, incoordinate, incoordination, infraorder, inordinate, inordination, insubordinate, insubordination, magnorder, mirorder, ordain, ordainment, order, ordinal, ordinance, ordinand, ordinariate, ordinary, ordinate, ordination, ordinative, ordnance, ornery, parvorder, preordain, preorder, preordination, quasiorder, reordain, reorder, reordination, suborder, subordinary, subordinate, subordination, superordain, superorder, superordinate, superordination
oreg-	reach	Greek	ὀρέγειν (orégein), ὀρεκτός (orektós), ὀρεκτικός (orektikós), ὄρεξις (órexis), ὄρεγμα (óregma)	anorectic, anorexia, dysorexia, orectic, orexin, parorexia
org-	work	Greek	ὄργια (órgia)	orgasm
organ-	organ, instrument, tool	Greek	ὄργανον (órganon)	organic, organism, organogenesis
ori-, ort-	rise	Latin	oriri, ortus	aboriginal, abort, abortifacient, abortion, abortive, disorient, disorientation, orient, oriental, Orientalia, orientate, orientation, orientational, orientative, origin, original, originality, originate, origination, originator, reorient, reorientation
orn-	decorate	Latin	ōrnāre	adorn, adornment, ornament, ornamental, ornamentation, ornate, ornative, ornature, suborn, subornation
ornith-	bird	Greek	ὄρνις, ὄρνιθος (órnis, órnithos)	Avernus, ornithology, ornithomancy, ornithorhynchus, ornithosis
orphan-		Greek	ὀρφανός (orphanós), ὀρφανότης	orphan
orth-	straight	Greek	ὀρθός (orthós), ὀρθότης	orthocenter, orthocentric, orthodontia, orthodontic, orthodontist, orthodox, orthodoxy, orthographic, ortholog, orthologous, orthonym, orthopedic, orthoscope, orthosis, orthostat, orthostyle, orthotic
oryz-	rice	Greek	ὄρυζα (óruza), ὀρύζιον	Oryza, Oryzomys, rice, risotto
oscill-	swing	Latin	oscillum	oscillate, oscillation, oscillator, oscillatory
osm-	odor	Greek	ὀσμή (osmḗ), ὄσμησις	anosmia, anosmic, cacosmia, coprosmia, dysosmia, dysosmic, euosmia, hyperosmia, hyperosmic, hyposmia, hyposmic, osmium, osmolagnia, osmophobia, osphresiolagnia, parosmia, phantosmia, troposmia
osm-	push, thrust	Greek	ὠσμός (ōsmós)	osmometry, osmosis, osmostat, osmotic
oss-	bone	Latin	os, ossis	exossation, interosseous, ossature, osselet, osseocartilaginous, osseointegration, osseous, ossicle, ossicular, ossiferous, ossification, ossifrage, ossify, ossuary
oste-	bone	Greek	ὀστέον, ὀστέου (ostéon, ostéou), ὀστοῦν, ὀστοῦ (ostoûn, ostoû)	dysostosis, endosteum, exostosis, hyperostosis, monostotic, Osteichthyes, osteoarthritis, osteoblast, osteochondritis, osteochondrosis, osteoclast, osteogenic, osteogenesis, osteoid, osteology, osteolysis, osteoma, osteomalacia, osteonecrosis, osteopathy, osteopenia, osteoporosis, osteosarcoma, osteosis, osteothrombosis, osteotome, osteotomy, periosteum, synostosis
osti-	entrance	Latin	ostium	ostiary, ostiolar, ostiole, ostium
ostrac-	shell	Greek	ὄστρειον (óstreion), ὀστρακίζω (ostrakízō), ὄστρακον (óstrakon)	Entomostraca, Leptostraca, Malacostraca, ostracism, ostracize, ostracod, ostracoderm, ostracon, periostracum
ostre-	oyster	Greek	ὄστρεον	ostreophagist, oyster
ot-	ear	Greek	οὖς, ὠτός (oûs, ōtós)	anotia, Aotus, microtia, Myosotis, otalgia, otic, otitis, otocephaly, otocleisis, otoconium, otocyst, otodynia, otolith, otology, otopathy, otophyma, otoplasty, otorhinology, otorrhea, otosclerosis, otoscope, otoscopy, ototomy, parotic, parotid, periotic, synotia
ov-	egg	Latin	ovum	obovate, oval, ovarian, ovariole, ovary, ovate, ovicapsule, ovicidal, ovicide, oviduct, oviferous, oviform, oviposition, ovipositor, ovolo, ovular, ovulation, ovulatory, ovule, ovum, pluriovulate
ovi-	sheep	Latin	ovis	ovile, ovine
oxy-	sharp, pointed	Greek	ὀξύς (oxús)	anoxia, anoxic, dioxide, hypoxia, monoxide, oxide, oxyanion, oxygen, oxyhalide, oxymoron, oxyntic, oxytone, paroxysm, pentoxide, polyoxide, tetraoxygen, tetroxide, trioxide
oz-	smell	Greek	ὄζειν (ózein), ὄζων (ózōn), ὄζη	ozocerite, ozone, ozopore
