= Osculate =

In mathematics, osculate, meaning to touch (from the Latin osculum meaning kiss), may refer to:

- osculant, an invariant of hypersurfaces
- osculating circle
- osculating curve
- osculating plane
- osculating orbit
- osculating sphere

The obsolete Quinarian system of biological classification attempted to group creatures into circles which could touch or overlap with adjacent circles, a phenomenon called 'osculation'.
