= List of Greek and Latin roots in English/N =

Lists of Greek and Latin roots in English beginning with other letters:
- A
- B
- C
- D
- E
- F
- G
- H
- I
- J
- K
- L
- M
- N
- O
- P
- Q
- R
- S
- T
- U
- V
- X
- Z

== N ==
| Root | Meaning in English | Origin language | Etymology (root origin) | English examples |
|---|---|---|---|---|
| nap- | turnip | Latin | nāpus | napiform, neep |
| nar- | nostril | Latin | naris | internarial, nares, narial, naris, prenarial |
| narc- | numb | Greek | ναρκᾶν (narkân), νάρκη (nárkē) | narcolepsy, narcosis, narcotic |
| narr- | tell | Latin | narrare | counternarrative, inenarrable, narration, narrative, narrator |
| nas- | nose | Latin | nāsus | intranasal, nasal, nasalance, nasalis, nasality, nasolabial, nonnasal |
| nasc-, nat- | born | Latin | nascere, nāsci (past participle natus) | adnascent, adnate, adnation, agnate, agnatic, agnation, binational, cognate, cognatic, cognation, connascence, connascent, connate, connation, connatural, denature, enascent, enate, enatic, enation, impregnate, innate, international, multinational, nada, naïf, naissant, naïve, nascency, nascent, natal, natality, nation, national, nationality, native, nativity, natural, naturality, nature, née, nonnative, postnatal, pregnancy, pregnant, prenatal, preternatural, renaissance, renaissant, renascence, renascent, renature, subnational, supernatural, supranational, transnational, transnationality |
| naut- | ship | Greek | ναῦς (naûs), ναύτης (naútēs) | aeronautic, Argonaut, astronaut, cosmonaut, nausea, nautical, nautilus |
| nav- | ship | Latin | nāvis | antenave, naval, nave, navicular, navigable, navigate, navy, nonnavigable |
| ne- | spin, thread | Greek | νεῖν (neîn), νῆσις "spinning", νῆμα, νήματος (nêma, nḗmatos) | axoneme, diplonema, leptonema, nematocyst, nematocyte, nematode, nematology, pachynema, synnema, treponema, zygonema |
| ne-, neo- | new | Greek | νέϝος, νέος (néos) | Neolithic, neologism, neon, neonate, neophyte |
| neb-, nub- | cloud | Latin | nebula, nubes | nebula, nebular, nebulosity, nebulous, nuance, nubilous, obnubilate |
| necr- | dead | Greek | νεκρός (nekrós), νέκρωσις (nékrōsis) | necromancy, Necronomicon, necrophilia, necrophobia, necropolis, necropsy, necrosis, necrospermia, necrotic, necrotize, necrotomy |
| nect- | swimming | Greek | νηκτός (nēktós) | nectopod, nekton |
| nect-, nex- | join, tie | Latin | nectere, nexus | adnexum, annectent, annex, annexation, annexion, connect, connexion, deannexation, disconnect, interconnect, nexus, reconnect |
| neg- | say no | Latin | negare | negative, renegade, renege |
| nem-, nom- | arrangement, law | Greek | νέμειν (némein), νομός (nomós), νόμος (nómos), νέμεσις (némesis), νομάς, νομάδος (nomás, nomádos), νομαδικός (nomadikós), νομαδία, νομή, νομίζειν (nomízein), νόμισμα (nómisma) | anomie, anomy, antinome, antinomic, antinomy, archnemesis, autonomy, isonomy, metronomic, nemesis, nomad, nomadic, nomadism, nomadize, nomarch, nomarchy, nome, nomology, nomothetic, Numidia, numismatics |
| nemat- | hair | Greek | νῆμα, νήματος (nêma, nḗmatos) | nematocyst, nematocyte, nematode, nematology |
| nemor- | grove, woods | Latin | nemus, nemoris | nemoral, nemorous |
| nephr- | kidney | Greek | νεφρός (nephrós) | mesonephric, mesonephros, metanephridium, metanephros, nephridiopore, nephridium, nephrite, nephritis, nephrogenesis, nephrolith, nephrolithiasis, nephrologist, nephrology, nephron, nephroptosis, nephrostome, pronephros, protonephridium |
| nerv- | sinew, nerve | Latin | nervus | enervate, enervation, enervative, innervate, innervation, nerval, nervate, nerve, nervose, nervosity, nervous, reinnervation, trinervate |
| nes- | island | Greek | νῆσος (nêsos) | Chersonesus, Indonesia, Melanesia, Micronesia, Peloponnese, Polynesia |
| neur- | nerve, sinew | Greek | νεῦρον (neûron) | aponeurosis, endoneurium, epineurium, neural, neurapraxia, neurasthenia, neuritis, neuroblast, neuroblastoma, neurocranium, neurocyte, neuroendocrine, neuroendocrinology, neurologic, neurologist, neurology, neuromorphology, neuron, neurone, neuropathic, neuropathology, neuropathy, neuroplastic, neurosis, neurosurgeon, neurosurgery, neurotic, neuroticism, perineurium, polyneuropathy |
| nict- | beckon, wink | Latin | nictari | nictate, nictation, nictitate, nictitation |
| nigr- | black | Latin | niger | denigrate, denigration, denigrative, denigrator, negrita, negrito, negritude, nigrescence, nigrescent, nigrine, nigrities, nigritude |
| nihil- | nothing | Latin | nihilum | annihilate, annihilation, annihilator, nihil, nil |
| niv- | snow | Latin | nix, nivis | Nevada, névé, nival, nivation, niveus, subnival, subnivean |
| noc- | hurt, harm | Latin | nocere | innocence, innocent, innocuity, innocuous, innoxious, nocebo, nocent, nociception, nociceptive, nocifensor, nocument, nocuous, noxious, nuisance, obnoxious |
| noct- | night | Latin | nox (noctis) | equinoctial, equinox, noctambulous, noctiluca, noctilucent, noctule, nocturn, nocturnal, nocturnality, nocturne, notturno, seminocturnal, trinoctial |
| nod- | knot | Latin | nodus | acnode, binodal, crunode, denouement, extranodal, internodal, internode, intranodal, multinodal, nodal, node, nodose, nodosity, nodular, nodulation, nodule, nodulose, nodulus, nodus, supernode, tacnode, trinodal, uninodal |
| nom- | arrangement, law, order | Greek | νόμος (nómos), νομή | agronomy, antinomy, astronomy, autonomous, autonomy, bionomics, economics, economy, gastronomy, metronome, numismatic, polynomial, taxonomy |
| nomad- | those who let pasture herds | Greek | νομάς, νομάδος (nomás, nomádos), νομαδικός (nomadikós) | nomad, nomadic, nomadism, nomadize |
| nomen-, nomin- | name | Latin | nomen, nominis | agnomen, agnominal, agnomination, binomen, binominal, denomination, denominational, denominative, denominator, ignominious, ignominy, innominate, innomine, interdenominational, multidenominational, multinominal, nomenclator, nomenclature, nominal, nominate, nomination, nominative, nominator, nominee, nondenominational, noun, postnominal, praenomen, prenominal, pronominal, pronoun, redenomination, renominate, renown, surnominal, trinomen, trinominal |
| non- | not | Latin | non | none, nonexistent, non-fiction, noninvasive |
| non- | ninth | Latin | nōnus | nonary, None, nonet, noon |
| nonagen- | ninety each | Latin | nonageni | nonagenarian, nonagenary |
| nonagesim- | ninetieth | Latin | nonagesimus | nonagesimal |
| norm- | carpenter's square | Latin | norma | abnormal, abnormality, binormal, circumnormal, denormal, enormity, enormous, nonnormal, nonnormative, norm, normable, normal, normality, normative, quasinorm, seminorm, seminormable, seminormal, subnormal |
| not- | south | Greek | νότος (nótos) | Notogaea, Notomys, Nototherium |
| not- | back | Greek | νῶτον (nôton), νῶτος, νωτιαῖος | notochord |
| not- | letter, mark, note | Latin | notare | annotate, annotation, annotator, connotation, connotational, connotative, connote, denotation, denotational, denotative, denotatum, denote, nondenotative, nonnotable, nonnotational, notability, notable, notarial, notariat, notary, notate, notation, notational |
| noth- | spurious | Greek | νόθος (nóthos) | nothogenus |
| nov-, nome-, non-, novem- | nine | Latin | novem | November, novennial, Nonillion, Nomedecillion |
| nov- | new | Latin | novus | innovate, innovation, innovational, innovative, innovator, innovatory, nova, novation, novel, novella, novelty, novice, novitiate, renovatable, renovate, renovation, renovative, renovator, supernova |
| noven- | nine each | Latin | noveni | Novena, novenary |
| novendec- | nineteen | Latin | novendecim | novemdecillion |
| nox- | harm | Latin | noxa | noxious, obnoxious |
| nu- | nod | Latin | nuere | circumnutate, circumnutation, counternutation, innuendo, innuent, numen, numinous, nutant, nutation |
| nub-, nupt- | to marry, to wed | Latin | nubes, nubis, nubere | connubial, connubiality, nubile, nuptial, postnuptial, prenuptial |
| nuc- | nut | Latin | nux, nucis | enucleate, enucleation, extranuclear, internuclear, intranuclear, multinucleate, nougat, nucament, nucellar, nucellus, nucifer, nuciferine, nuciferous, nuciform, Nucifraga, nucivorous, nuclear, nucleate, nucleation, nucleolar, nucleolate, nucleolus, nucleus, pronuclear, pronucleus, supranuclear |
| nuch- | back of neck | Latin | nucha | nuchal cord |
| nud- | naked | Latin | nudus | denudation, denude, nonnude, nude, nudist, nudity, seminude, seminudity |
| null- | none | Latin | nullus | nullify |
| numer- | number | Latin | numerus | denumerable, enumerable, enumerate, enumeration, enumerative, enumerator, equinumerant, equinumerous, innumerable, innumeracy, innumerate, innumerous, nonenumerative, numerable, numeracy, numéraire, numeral, numerary, numerate, numeration, numerative, numerator, numerical, numero, numerosity, numerous, renumerate, supernumerary |
| nunci- | announce | Latin | nuntius | announce, announcement, annunciation, denounce, denouncement, denunciation, enounce, enouncement, enunciable, enunciate, enunciation, enunciative, internuncial, internuncio, nunciature, nuncio, obnounce, pronounce, pronouncement, pronunciation, pronuntiatio, renounce, renouncement, renunciation |
| nutri- | nourish | Latin | nutrire | innutrition, malnourish, malnourishment, malnutrition, nonnutritional, nourish, nourishment, nurse, nurturance, nurture, nutrient, nutriment, nutrition, nutritional, nutritious |
| nyct- | night | Greek | νύξ, νυκτός (núx, nuktós) | nyctalgia, nyctanthous, nyctinasty, nyctophilia, nyctophobia |
| nyst- | nod | Greek | νυστάζειν (nustázein), (nustagmós) | electronystagmography, nystagmic, nystagmus |
