= List of Greek and Latin roots in English/V =

Lists of Greek and Latin roots in English beginning with other letters:
- A
- B
- C
- D
- E
- F
- G
- H
- I
- J
- K
- L
- M
- N
- O
- P
- Q
- R
- S
- T
- U
- V
- X
- Z

== V ==
Root	Meaning in English	Origin language	Etymology (root origin)	English examples
vac-	empty	Latin	vacare	evacuate, vacancy, vacant, vacate, vacation, vacuous, vacuum
vacc-	cow	Latin	vacca	vaccary, vaccination, vaccine
vacil-	waver	Latin	vacillare "sway, be untrustworthy"	vacillate, vacillation
vad-, vas-	go	Latin	vadere	evade, pervasive
vag-	wander	Latin	vagus, vagare	vagabond, vague
val-	strength, worth	Latin	valere	ambivalence, avail, equivalent, evaluate, prevail, valence, valiant, valid, valor, value
van-	empty, vain, idle	Latin	vanus "empty", also vanescere "vanish"	evanescent, vain, vanish, vanity
vap-	steam	Latin	vapor	evaporate, evaporation, evaporative, evaporator, evaporite, nonevaporative, vapid, vapidity, vapor, vaporescence, vaporescent, vaporific, vaporous
vas-	vessel	Latin	vas	vascular, vase, vasectomy, vessel
vari-	vary	Latin	variare	bivariate, covariate, covariation, intervarietal, invariable, invariance, invariant, variable, variance, variant, variate, variation, variegate, varietal, variety, variola, variolation, variorum, various, vary
varic-	straddle	Latin	varicare "to straddle", from varus "bowlegged"	prevaricate
veh-, vect-	carry	Latin	vehere "to carry", vectus	invective, inveigh, vector, vehement, vehicle
vel-	veil	Latin	velum	revelation, velate
vell-, vuls-	pull	Latin	vellere, vulsus	convulsion
veloc-	quick	Latin	velox, velocis	velocity
ven-	vein	Latin	vena	intravenous, venosity, venule
ven-	poison	Latin	vena	antivenomous, veneniferous, venom
ven-	hunt	Latin	venari	venison
ven-, vent-	come	Latin	venire	advent, adventure, avenue, circumvent, contravene, convene, convenient, convention, event, intervene, intervention, invent, prevent, revenue, souvenir, supervene, venue, venture
vend-	sell	Latin	vendere	vend, vendor
vener-	respectful	Latin	venus, veneris	venerable, veneration, venereal
vent-	wind	Latin	ventus	ventilation, ventilator
ventr-	belly	Latin	venter, ventris	ventral
ver-	true	Latin	verus	aver, veracious, verdict, verify, verisimilar, verisimilitude, verity, very
verb-	word	Latin	verbum	verbal, verbatim, verbosity
verber-	whip	Latin	verber	reverberation
verm-	worm	Latin	vermis	vermicompost, vermiculite, vermiform, vermin
vern-	spring	Latin	ver, vernus	vernal
vers-, vert-	turn	Latin	versus, past participle of vertere	adverse, adversity, advertise, anniversary, avert, controversy, controvert, conversant, conversation, converse, convert, diversify, divert, extrovert, introvert, inverse, invert, perverse, pervert, reverse, revert, subvert, tergiversate, transverse, universe, versatile, verse, version, versus, vertebra, vertex, vertical, vertigo
vesic-	bladder	Latin	vesica	vesical
vesper-	evening, western	Latin	vespera	vesperal
vest-	clothing, garment	Latin	vestire "to clothe", related to vestis "garment"	divest, invest, investiture, transvestite, travesty, vest, vestibule, vestment
vestig-	track	Latin	vestigium	investigate, vestigial
vet-	forbid	Latin	vetare	veto
veter-	old	Latin	vetus, veteris	inveterate, veteran
vi-	way	Latin	via	deviate, obviate, obvious, via
vic-	change	Latin	vicis	vicar, vicarious, vice versa, vicissitude
vicen-, vigen-	twenty each	Latin	viceni	vicenary
vicesim-, vigesim-	twentieth	Latin	vicesimus	vicesimary, vicesimation, vigesimal
vid-, vis-	see	Latin	videre, visus	advice, advisable, advise, advisement, advisor, advisory, clairvoyance, clairvoyant, counterview, enviable, envious, envisage, envisagement, envision, envy, evidence, evident, evidential, evidentiality, evidentiary, improvidence, improvident, improvisation, improvisational, improvise, imprudence, imprudent, inadvisable, inevident, interview, interviewee, invidious, invisibility, invisible, nonevidentiary, nonsupervisory, nonvisual, preview, previse, provide, providence, provident, provision, provisional, provisionality, proviso, provisory, prudence, prudent, prudential, purvey, purveyance, purveyor, purview, review, reviewal, revisal, revise, revision, revisionary, revisit, supervise, supervision, supervisor, supervisory, survey, surveyor, surview, survise, videlicet, video, view, vis-à-vis, visa, visage, visibility, visible, vision, visionary, visit, visitation, visor, vista, visual, visuality, voilà, voyeur
vigil-	watchful	Latin	vigil, also vigilare	invigilate, reveille, surveillance, vigil, vigilance, vigilant, vigilante
vil-	cheap	Latin	vilis	revile, vile, vilify
vill-	country house	Latin	villa	villa, village, villain
vill-	shaggy hair	Latin	villus	intervillous, velour, velvet, villiform, villose, villosity, villous, villus
vin-	wine	Latin	vinum	vigneron, vignette, vinaceous, vinaigrette, vine, vineal, vinegar, viniculture, vinosity, vinous
vinc-, vict-	conquer	Latin	vincere (past participle victus)	convict, conviction, convince, evict, evince, invincible, province, vanquish, vanquishment, victor, victorious, victory
vind-	to punish, avenge	Latin	vindico	avenge, revanchism, revenge, vendetta, venge, vengeance, vengeful, vindicate, vindictive
viol-	violence	Latin	violens	violation, violence
vir-	man	Latin	vir	decemvir, decemvirate, duumvirate, quadrumvirate, septemvir, septemvirate, triumvir, triumvirate, vigintivirate, virago, virile, virilescence, virility, virilocal, virilocality, virtual, virtuality, virtue, virtuosity, virtuoso, virtuous
vir-	green	Latin	virere	verdure, virid, viridescent, viridian, viridity
vir-	poison, venom	Latin	vīrus	retroviral, retrovirus, rotavirus, togavirus, viral, virality, viricidal, viricide, virucidal, virucide, virulence, virulent, virus
virg-	rod, twig	Latin	virga	virga, virgate, virgula, virgularian, virgulate, virgule
virgin-	maiden	Latin	virgō, virginis	virgin, virginal, virginity, Virgoan
visc-	thick	Latin	viscum	viscosity
viscer-	internal organ	Latin	viscus, visceris	eviscerate, visceral
vit-	life	Latin	vita	vital, vitality, vitamin
vitell-	yolk	Latin	vitellus	vitellogenesis
viti-	fault	Latin	vitium	vice, vitiate, vicious, vituperate
vitr-	glass	Latin	vitrum	vitreous, vitrification, vitriol, virtine
viv-	live	Latin	vivere "to live", related to vita "life"	convivial, revive, survive, viable, victual, vivacious, vivacity, vivid, vivisection
voc-	call, voice	Latin	vocare (to call), from vox "voice" (genitive vocis)	advocacy, advocate, advocation, advocator, advocatory, advoke, advowson, avocation, avouch, avow, avowal, avowry, convocate, convocation, convocator, convoke, disavow, disavowal, equivocal, equivocate, equivocation, evocable, evocation, evocative, evocator, evoke, invocable, invocate, invocation, invocative, invocator, invoke, prevocational, provocate, provocateur, provocation, provocative, provocator, provoke, reavow, reinvoke, revocable, revocation, revoke, vocabulary, vocal, vocation, vocational, vocative, vociferous, voice, vouch, vouchee, voucher, vouchsafe
vol-	fly	Latin	volare	avolation, circumvolant, circumvolation, nonvolatile, volatile, volatility, volitant, volitation
vol-	will	Latin	voluntas "will" from velle "to wish"	benevolence, benevolent, involuntary, malevolence, malevolent, omnibenevolence, velleity, volitient, volition, volitional, volitive, voluntary, Voluntaryism, volunteer, voluptuary, voluptuous
volv-, volut-	roll	Latin	volvere, volutus	advolution, archivolt, circumvolute, circumvolution, circumvolve, coevolution, coevolutionary, coevolve, convolute, convolution, devolve, evolve, involve, revolve, valve, vault, volte, voluble, volume, voluminous, volva, Volvox, volvulus, voussoir, vulva
vom-	discharge	Latin	vomere	vomit, vomition, vomitory, vomitus
vor-, vorac-	swallow	Latin	vorare, vorax	carnivore, carnivorous, devoration, devoré, devour, herbivore, herbivorous, locavore, omnivore, omnivorous, voracious, voracity, voraginous
vov-, vot-	vow	Latin	vovere, votus	devote, devotee, devotion, devotional, devout, devolve, devow, votary, vote, votive, vow
vulg-	crowd	Latin	vulgus	divulge, vulgarity, vulgate
vulner-	wound	Latin	vulnus, vulneris	vulnerable
vulp-	fox	Latin	vulpēs, vulpis	vulpine
