= Itinerary =

Itinerary or Itineraries or Itinerarium may refer to:

== Travel ==
- Itinerarium, an Ancient Roman road map in the form of a listing of cities, villages, and other stops, with the intervening distances
- Itinerarium Burdigalense, also known as the Itinerarium Hierosolymitanum ("Jerusalem Itinerary"), the oldest Christian road map in the form of a listing of cities, villages, and other stops with the intervening distances
- Antonine Itinerary, a famous register of the stations and distances along various roads within the Roman Empire
- Travel itinerary, a schedule of intended destinations and activities for travelers
  - Itineraries, or travel literature, travel journals and diaries
  - Itineraries of the Roman emperors, 337–361
  - Itinerary, the route of a road trip, or the proposed outline of one
  - Itinerary, the route of a tour or the proposed outline of one
  - Itinerary, a route of travel, or the proposed outline such
  - Itinerary, or travel plan, a package of actions designed by an organisation to encourage safe, healthy and sustainable travel options

== Arts, entertainment, and media ==
- Itinerary (album), a 1991 album by saxophonist Steve Lacy
- Itinerary of a Spoiled Child, a French film directed by Claude Lelouch in 1988

== Other uses ==
- Itinerary, a sequence of symbols in symbolic dynamics
- Itinerary, or schedule, a time-management tool
- Itinerary file, a file format designed as an itinerary data format for TomTom devices

== See also ==
- Guidebook, a book of information about a place, designed for the use of visitors or tourists
- Trip planner, a website dedicated to helping the users plan their trips
