= List of Greek and Latin roots in English/B =

All Latin and Greek roots beginning with B

Lists of Greek and Latin roots in English beginning with other letters:
- A
- B
- C
- D
- E
- F
- G
- H
- I
- J
- K
- L
- M
- N
- O
- P
- Q
- R
- S
- T
- U
- V
- X
- Z

== B ==
Root	Meaning in English	Origin language	Etymology (root origin)	English examples
ba- (ΒΑ)	to step	Greek	βαίνειν (baínein), βατός (batós), βάσις (básis), βῆμα, βήματος (bêma, bḗmatos), βάτης (bátēs), βάθρον (báthron), βατεῖν	acrobat, acrobatic, adiabatic, aerobatic, anabasis, anabatic, antiparabema, base, basic, basidiocarp, basidioma, basidiomycete, basidiospore, basidium, basion, basionym, basis, basophilic, bema, catabasis, catabatic, diabase, diabatic, diabetes, diabetic, dibasic, hyperbaton, hypobasis, katabasis, katabatic, monobasic, polybasic, stereobate, stylobate, tribasic
bac-	rod-shaped	Latin	baculum	baculiform, baculum, bacteria
bal-, bel-, bol- (ΒΑΛ)	throw	Greek	βάλλειν (bállein), βολή (bolḗ), βλῆμα (blêma)	ametabolic, ametabolism, amphibole, amphibolic, amphibolite, amphibolous, amphiboly, anabolic, anabolism, astrobleme, ball, ballism, ballista, ballistic, ballistospore, belomancy, belonephobia, bolide, bolometer, catabolic, catabolism, devil, diabolic, emblem, emblematic, embolic, embolism, embolismic, embolize, embolon, embolus, emboly, hemiballismus, holometabolism, hyperbola, hyperbole, hyperbolic, hyperboloid, metabolic, metabolism, metabolite, metabolize, palaver, parable, parabola, parabolic, paraboloid, parle, parley, parol, parole, problem, problematic, symbol, symbolic, symbolism, symbolist, symbolize, symbology, taurobolium, thromboembolism
bapt- (ΒΑΦ)	dip	Greek	βάπτειν (báptein), βάμμα (bámma)	abaptiston, Anabaptist, baptism, baptize
bar-	weight, pressure	Greek	βαρύς (barús), βάρος (báros)	abarognosis, antibaryon, baresthesia, bariatric, baritone, barognosis, barogram, barograph, barometer, barometric, barophobia, barostat, barycentre, barycentric, baryogenesis, baryon, barysphere, baryton, barytone, hyperbaric, hypobaric, isobar, isobaric
bas-	step	Greek	βάσις	
bath-	deep, depth	Greek	βαθύς (bathús), βάθος (báthos)	batholith, bathophobia, bathos, bathymetry, bathyscaphe, bathysphere, isobathic
be-, beat-	bless	Latin	beare, beatus	beatification
bell-, belli-	war	Latin	bellum, belli	antebellum, bellicose, belligerent, rebellion
ben-	good, well	Latin	bene (adverb)	beneficence, benefit, benevolent, benign, benignant, benignity
bet-	B, b	Greek	beta	alphabet, alphabetic, analphabetic, panalphabetic, polyalphabetic
bi-, bin-, bis-	two	Latin	bis, "twice"; bini, "in twos"	bicycle, biennial, bifocal, bisexual, bigamy, binary, binoculars, bipod bipolar biscotti
bib-	drink	Latin	bibere, bibitus	bib, beer, beverage, imbibe
bibl-	book	Greek	βίβλος (bíblos), βιβλίον (biblíon) "book"	bible, biblioclasm, biblioclast, bibliogony, bibliographic, bibliography, biblioklept, bibliomancy, bibliomania, bibliophile, bibliophilia, bibliophobe, bibliophobia, bibliotaph
bio-, bi-	life	Greek	βιοῦν (bioûn), βίος (bíos) "life", βιωτός (biōtós), βιωτικός (biōtikós), βίωσις (bíōsis)	abiogenesis, abiotic, aerobiology, anhydrobiosis, anoxybiosis, antibiotic, astrobiology, autobiography, biocentrism, biochron, biocoenosis, biogenesis, biographic, biography, biologism, biologist, biology, biome, biometric, biomorph, biomorphism, biophilia, biophysicist, biophysics, biopoiesis, biopolymer, biopsy, biorhythm, biosemiotic, biosphere, biostasis, biosynthesis, biota, biotic, biotin, biotope, biotype, biozone, chemobiosis, cryobiosis, cryptobiosis, ectosymbiosis, endosymbiont, endosymbiosis, enterobiasis, exobiology, macrobiotic, microbiology, osmobiosis, probiotic, symbiogenesis, symbiology, symbiont, symbiosis, symbiotic
blast-	germ, embryo, bud, cell with nucleus	Greek	βλαστάνειν (blastánein), "to sprout, bud", βλαστός (blastós), βλάστημα (blástēma)	blastema, blastochyle, blastocoel, blastocoele, blastocyst, blastoderm, blastoma, blastula, cytotrophoblast, diploblasty, ectoblast, endoblast, entoblast, fibroblast, osteoblast, sideroblast
blenn-	slime	Greek	βλέννος (blénnos)	blennadenitis, blennophobia, blennosperma, blennorrhagia
bol-	throw	Greek		
bol-	clod, lump	Greek	βῶλος (bôlos)	bole, bolus, embolism
bomb-	boom	Greek	βομβεῖν, βόμβος, βόμβησις	bomb, bound
bon-	good	Latin	bonus	bonify, bonitary
bore-	north	Latin from Greek	borealis "northern" from Βορέας (Boréas) "the north wind"	borealis
botan-	plant	Greek	βοτάνη, βότανον (botánē, bótanon), βοτανικός	botanic, botanist, botanology, botany
bov-, bu-	cow, ox	Latin	bos (genitive bovis) "ox, cow"	beef, boor, bovine, bucinator muscle
brachi-, brachio-	arm	Latin from Greek	bracchium	brachiferous, brachial artery, brachiocubital
brachi-, brachio-, brachion-, brachioni-	arm	Greek	βραχίων (brakhíōn)	brachialgia, brachionerysipelas, brachionigraph, brachiorrhachidian, Brachiosaurus
brachy-	short	Greek	βραχύς (brakhús)	amphibrach, brachistochrone, brachycephaly, brachydactyly, brachyury, dibrach, tribrach
brady-, bradys-	slow	Greek	βραδύς (bradús), βράδος (brádos)	bradycardia, bradysuria, bradytelic
branchi-	gill	Greek	βράγχιον (bránkhion)	branchiopneustic, branchiopod, nudibranch
broc-	rain, wet	Greek	ἐμβροχή (embrokhḗ)	embrocation, embrocate
brev-	brief, short (time)	Latin	brevis, breviare	abbreviate, brevextensor, brevicaudate, brevity, brief
bromat-, bromato-, broma-, bromo-	food	Greek	βρῶμα (brôma)	bromatium, bromateccrisis, bromatherapy, bromatology, bromography
brom-	oats	Greek	βρόμος, βρόμη (brómos, brómē) "oats"	brome, Bromus, Bromus ramosus
brom-	stench	Greek	βρῶμος (brômos) "stench, clangor"	bromate, bromide, bromine, bromoderma, organobromine
bronch-	windpipe	Greek	βρόγχος (brónkhos), βρόγχια (brónkhia)	bronchia, bronchiole, bronchion, bronchitis, bronchomalacia, bronchopneumonia, bronchus, tracheobronchomalacia
bront-	thunder	Greek	βροντή (brontḗ)	brontology, brontophobia, Brontosaurus
brot-	mortal	Greek	βροτός (brotós)	ambrosia, ambrotype
bucc-	cheek, mouth, cavity	Latin	bucca	buccal, buccilingual, buccolingual
bulb-	bulbous	Latin	bulbus	bulbiform, bulbiparous, bulboartrial, bulborrhexis, bulbous, bulbule
bull-	bubble, flask	Latin	bullire, bulla	bullectomy, bulliferous, ebullient, ebullism
burs-	pouch, purse	Latin	bursa	bursa, bursalogy, bursar, bursary, bursectomy, bursiform, disburse
butyr-	butter	Greek	βούτυρον (boúturon)	butyric
byss-	bottom	Greek	βυσσός, βυσσοῦ (bussós, bussoû)	abyss, abyssopelagic, hypabyssal
byss-	flax	Greek	βύσσος (bússos)	byssus
