= Opsimath =

Person who begins, or continues, to study or learn late in life

An opsimath is a person who begins, or continues, to study or learn late in life. The word is derived from the Greek ὀψέ (opsé), meaning 'late', and μανθάνω (manthánō), meaning 'learn'.

Opsimathy was once frowned upon, used as a put-down with implications of laziness, and considered less effective by educators than early learning. The emergence of "opsimath clubs" has demonstrated that opsimathy has shed much of this negative connotation.

Notable opsimaths include 19th-century army officer and orientalist Sir Henry Rawlinson, Vivian Stanshall's fictitious character Sir Henry Rawlinson, 11h-century Chinese scholar‌ Su Xun, Grandma Moses, Rabbi Akiva (according to the Talmud, he began studying at age 40), and Cato the Elder, who learned Greek only at the age of 80.
