= List of Greek and Latin roots in English/E =

All Latin and Greek roots beginning with E

Lists of Greek and Latin roots in English beginning with other letters:
- A
- B
- C
- D
- E
- F
- G
- H
- I
- J
- K
- L
- M
- N
- O
- P
- Q
- R
- S
- T
- U
- V
- X
- Z

== E ==
Root	Meaning in English	Origin language	Etymology (root origin)	English examples
ebon-	dark	Greek	ἔβενος (ébenos)	ebony, ebonize, ébéniste (from French)
ec-	out	Greek	ἐκ (ek)	eccentric, ecstasy, ecstatic
ecclesi-	assembly, congregation	Greek	ἐκκλησία (ekklēsía) from ἐκκαλέω (ekkaléō) "I summon" or "I call out"	Ecclesiastes, ecclesiastical
ech-	sound	Greek	ἠχή, ἠχώ, ἠχοῦς, ἠχεῖν (ēkheîn), ἤχημα	anechoic, catechesis, catechism, catechist, catechize, catechumen, echo, echoic
eco-	house	Greek	οἶκος (oîkos)	ecology, economics, economy, ecumenism
ecto-	outside	Greek	ἐκτός (ektós)	ectoderm, ectoparasite, ectotherm
ed-, es-	eat	Latin	edere, esus	comedo, comestible, edacity, edibility, edible, escarole, esculent, esurience, esurient, inedia, inedible, inescation, inescate, obese, obesity
eg-	goat	Greek	αἴξ, αἰγός (aíx, aigós)	egophony
egypt-	Egypt, egyptian	Greek	αἰγυπτος (aigyptos)	egyptology
ego-	self, I (first person)	Latin, Greek	ego, ἐγώ (egṓ)	egocentric, egocentrism, egoism, egoistic, egomania, egomaniac
eiren- (iren-)	peace	Greek	εἰρήνη (eirḗnē) "peace"	irenic (eirenic), irenology
electr-	amber	Greek	ἤλεκτρον (ḗlektron)	electric, electricity, electrolysis, electrolyte, electromagnetic, electron, electronic, polyelectrolyte
elem-, alm-	pity	Greek	ἔλεος, ἐλέου (éleos, eléou), ἐλεημοσύνη (eleēmosúnē)	almoner, alms, eleemosynary
em-, empt-	buy	Latin	emere, emptus	adeem, adempt, ademption, exemption, preempt, redeem
eme-	vomit	Greek	ἐμεῖν (emeîn), ἔμετος (émetos)	antiemetic, emesis, emetic, emetine, emetophobia, haematemesis
emul-	striving to equal, rivaling	Latin	aemulus, aemulare	emulator
en-, el-, em-	in	Greek	ἐν (en)	emphasis, enclitic, enthusiasm, ellipsis, elliptic
enanti-	opposite	Greek	ἐναντίος (enantíos)	enantiomer, enantiomerism, enantiomorph, enantiornithine
encephal-	brain	Greek	ἐγκέφαλος (enképhalos)	encephalopathy
endo-	inside, within	Greek	ἔνδον (éndon)	endocardial, endocerid, endocrine, endocytosis, endogamy, endogenous, endorheic, endoscopy, endoskeleton, endosperm, endospore
engy-	narrow	Greek	ἐγγύς (engús)	Engystomops, hypengyophobia
ennea-	nine	Greek	ἐννέα (ennéa), ἐννεάς, ἐννεάδος (enneás, enneádos)	ennead, enneadic, enneagon, enneagram, enneahedron, enneamer, enneastyle, enneasyllabic, enneode
ens-	sword	Latin	ensis	ensiferous, ensiform
eo-, eos-	dawn, east	Greek	Ἠώς, Ἕως (Ēṓs, Héōs)	Eocene, eohippus, Eosentomon, eosin, eosinophil, eosinophilic, Eozoic
ep-, epi-	upon	Greek	ἐπί (epí)	ephedra, ephemeral, ephemeris, epicenter, epidemic, epilog, epiphany, episteme, epistemic, epistemology, epitaph, epitaphios, epithet, epitome, epoch, eponymous
equ-, -iqu-	even, equal, level	Latin	aequus	equal, equanimity, equate, Equator, equilibrium, equinox, equipoise, equity, equivalence, equivocal, equivocate, iniquity
equ-	horse	Latin	equus	equestrian
ere-	row	Greek	ἐρέσσειν (eréssein), ἐρέτης (erétēs) "rower", ἐρετμόν (eretmón), εἰρεσία	trireme, trierarch, hyperetes
erg-, org-, urg-	work	Greek	ϝέργον (wérgon), έργον (érgon), ἐργάτης (ergátēs), ὄργανον (órganon), ὀργανικός (organikós), ὄργια (órgia)	allergic, allergy, argon, demiurge, dramaturgy, endoergic, energetic, energy, erg, ergate, ergatocracy, ergodic, ergometer, ergonomics, ergophobia, exoergic, gamergate, georgic, heterorganic, homorganic, liturgy, metallurgy, microorganism, organ, organic, organism, organist, organize, organogenesis, organoid, organoleptic, orgiastic, orgy, parergon, surgeon, synergism, synergy, theurgic, theurgist, theurgy, zymurgy
erot-	(sexual) love	Greek	ἔρως, ἔρωτος (érōs, érōtos)	erogenous, erotic, erotomania, erotophilia, erotophobia
err-	stray	Latin	errare	aberrance, aberrancy, aberrant, aberration, err, errant, erratic, erratum, erroneous, error, inerrant
erythr-	red	Greek	ἐρυθρός (eruthrós), ἐρύθημα (erúthēma)	erythema, Erythraean, erythraemia, [Erythrism[]] erythroblastopenia, erythrocyte, erythrocytosis, erythromelalgia, erythrophobia, erythrophore, erythroprosopalgia
eso-	within	Greek	ἔσω (ésō)	esophoria, esoteric, esotericism, esotropia
eteo-	true, original	Greek	ἐτεός (eteós)	Eteocretan, Eteocypriot
eth-	custom, habit	Greek	ἐθεῖν (etheîn), ἦθος (êthos)	ethic, ethics, ethology, ethos
ethm-	sieve, sift	Greek	ἠθεῖν (ētheîn), ἠθμός (ēthmós); ἤθειν (ḗthein)	ethmoid
ethn-	people, race, tribe, nation	Greek	ἔθνος (éthnos), ἐθνικός (ethnikós)	ethnarch, ethnarchy, ethnic, ethnoarchaeology, ethnography, ethnomusicology, polyethnic
etym-	true	Greek	ἔτυμος (étumos)	etymologic, etymologicon, etymologist, etymologize, etymology, etymon
eu-	well, good	Greek	εὖ (eû)	aneuploidy, eudaemon (eudemon), eukaryote, euphony, euphoria, euphoric, euploid, euthanasia
eur-	wide	Greek	εὐρύς (eurús), εὖρος "breadth, width"	aneurysm, eureka, Europe, eurypterid, microaneurysm
ex-, e-, ef-	outside, out of, from, out	Latin	ex	exclude, exist, exit, extend, extrude
exo-	outside	Greek	ἔξω (éxō)	exogamy, exoplanet, exoskeleton, exosome, exosphere, exoteric, exothermic, exotic, exoticism, exotropia
extra-	outer	Latin	extra, extraneus and exterus	estrange, estrangement, exterior, extra, extraneous, extraordinary, strange
extrem-	outermost, utmost	Latin	extremus	extreme, extremity, extremophile
