= List of Greek and Latin roots in English/L =

Lists of Greek and Latin roots in English beginning with other letters:
- A
- B
- C
- D
- E
- F
- G
- H
- I
- J
- K
- L
- M
- N
- O
- P
- Q
- R
- S
- T
- U
- V
- X
- Z

== L ==
Root	Meaning in English	Origin language	Etymology (root origin)	English examples
lab-, lep-	grasp, seize, take	Greek	λαμβάνειν (lambánein), λῆψις (lêpsis), λῆμμα (lêmma)	analemma, analemmatic, analeptic, catalepsy, cataleptic, dilemma, dilemmatic, epilepsy, epileptic, hypnolepsy, hysteroepilepsy, metalepsis, narcolepsy, nympholepsy, octosyllabic, procatalepsis, prolepsis, proleptic, proslepsis, syllabic, syllabism, syllable, syllabogram, syllepsis, trisyllabic, trisyllable
lab-, laps-	slide, slip	Latin	labi, lapsus	collapse, collapsible, elapse, labile, lapse, prolapse, relapse
labi-	lip	Latin	labia, labiae	bilabial, bilabiate, infralabial, labial, labiate, labium, sublabial, supralabial
labor-	work	Latin	labor	collaborate, collaboration, collaborative, collaborator, elaborate, elaboration, elaborative, elaborator, labor, laboratory, laborious
lacer-	tear	Latin	lacer	laceration
lacrim-	cry, tears	Latin	lacrima	lachrymal, lachrymose, lachrymosity, lacrimal, lacrimation, lacrimator, lacrimatory, lacrimous
lact-	milk	Latin	lac, lactis, lactare	ablactate, ablactation, lactary, lactase, lactate, lactation, lactational, lacteal, lacteous, lactescent, lactic, lactose, laitance, latte
lag-	hare	Greek	λαγός (lagós)	lagomorph, Sylvilagus
lamin-	layer, slice	Latin	lāmina	bilamellate, bilaminar, lame, lamé, lamella, lamellar, lamellate, laminate, lamination, laminose, laminous, multilaminar, omelet, omelette, trilaminar, unilaminar
lamp-	shine, torch	Greek	λάμπειν (lámpein), λαμπάς (lampás)	lamp, lamprid, Lampris
lapid-	stone	Latin	lapis, lapidis	dilapidate, dilapidation, lapidarian, lapidary, lapidate, lapidation, lapidator, lapideous, lapidescence, lapidescent, lapidicolous, lapidification, lapillation, lapilli
larg-	large	Latin	largus	allargando, enlarge, enlargement, largamente, largando, large, largess, largesse, largition, largo
larv-	ghost, mask	Latin	larva	larva, larvae, larval
lat-	broad, wide	Latin	latus	laticlave, latifoliate, latifundium, latitude, latitudinal, latitudinarian, latitudinous
later-	side	Latin	latus, lateris	ambilateral, ambilaterality, bilateral, bilaterality, collateral, contralateral, equilateral, extralateral, inequilateral, ipsilateral, lateral, laterality, matrilateral, multilateral, nonlateral, patrilateral, plurilateral, quadrilateral, semilatus, septilateral, trilateral, unilateral
laud-, laus-	praise	Latin	laudare "to praise"	laud, laudable, laudanum, laudation, Lauds, summa cum laude
lav-	wash	Latin	lavare	launder, laundry, lava, lavation, lavatory, lave, lavender, lavish, lotion
lax-	not tense, slack	Latin	laxus, laxare	delay, disrelish, laches, lax, laxation, laxative, laxity, leasable, lease, relax, relaxant, relaxation, relay, release, relish, sublease
lecith-	egg yolk	Greek	λέκιθος (lékithos)	lecithin
led-, les-, -lid-, -lis-	hurt, strike	Latin	laedere, laesus, -lidere	allision, collide, collision, elide, elidible, elision, illesive, lesion
leg-	say	Greek	λέγειν (légein), λέγεσθαι (légesthai), λεκτός (lektós), λεκτικός (lektikós), λέξις (léxis), λεξικός (lexikós), λεξικόν (lexikón), λόγος (lógos), (logḗ), λεγόμενον (legómenon), λογεῖον	alexia, alexithymia, apologetic, apologia, apology, dialect, dialectic, dialectologist, dialectology, dialog, dialogue, dyslexia, dyslexic, dyslogia, dyslogism, ethnolect, legomenon, lexeme, lexicography, lexicology, lexicon, lexigram, lexis, logic, logion, logos, prolegomenon
leg-, lect-	choose, gather, read	Latin	legere	coil, colleague, collect, collectible, collection, collective, collector, college, collegial, collegiality, collegian, collegiate, collegium, counterintelligence, cull, deselect, diligence, diligent, elect, electability, electable, electee, election, elective, elector, electoral, electorate, eligibility, eligible, elite, illegibility, illegible, ineligibility, ineligible, intellect, intellection, intellectual, intellectuality, intelligence, intelligent, intelligentsia, intercollegiate, lectern, lectin, lection, lectionary, lector, lectorate, lecture, legend, legendary, legendry, legibility, legible, legion, legionary, legionnaire, legume, leguminous, lesson, neglect, negligee, negligence, negligent, negligible, nonelective, nonelite, nonnegligible, nonselective, postelection, predilect, predilection, preelection, prelect, prelection, prelector, preselect, recollect, recollection, reelect, reelection, religion, reselect, sacrilege, select, selectance, selectee, selection, selective, selectivity, selector, superselection, uniselector
leg-	law	Latin	lex, legis	allege, disloyal, disloyalty, extralegal, illegal, legal, legality, legific, legislate, legislation, legislative, legislator, legislature, legitim, legitimacy, legitimate, loyal, loyalty, nonlegal, privilege
leg-	send	Latin	legare (from legis)	allegation, delegable, delegacy, delegate, delegatee, delegation, delegator, delegatory, league, legacy, legatary, legate, legatee, legatine, legation, legato, nondelegate, relegate, relegation, superdelegate
lei-	smooth	Greek	λεῖος (leîos)	leiomyoma
lekan-, lanx-, lanc-	dish, pot	Greek, Latin	λεκάνη (lekánē lanx	balance, lekane, phalanx, valance
leni-	gentle	Latin	lenis, lenire	leniency, lenient, leniment, lenis, lenition, lenitive, lenitude, lenity
leon-	lion	Latin	leo, leonis	dandelion, Leo, leonine, Leopold
lep-	flake, peel, scale	Greek	λέπειν (lépein), λεπίς, λεπίδος (lepís, lepídos)	antilepton, lepidolite, Lepidoptera, Lepidorhombus, lepidote, lepidotrichia, leprosy
lepto-	small, fine, thin	Greek	λεπτός (leptós)	leptocyte, leptogenesis, Leptomonas, lepton, leptophyllous
leuc-, leuk-	white	Greek	λευκός (leukós)	aleukemia, aleukocytosis, leucism, leucocyte, leucopenia, leucoplast, leukemia, leukocytopenia, leukopenia, leucophore
lev-	lift, light, raise	Latin	levare "lighten, raise", from levis "light" (in weight)	alleviate, alleviation, bas-relief, counter-relief, deleverage, elevate, elevation, elevator, leaven, legerity, levade, Levant, levee, lever, leverage, leviable, levitate, levitation, levity, levy, relevé, relief, relieve, sublevation, superelevation
liber-	free	Latin	liber, liberare	deliver, deliverance, illiberal, illiberality, liberal, liberality, liberalize, liberate, liberation, liberator, libertarian, liberticide, libertinage, libertine, liberty, ultraliberal
libr-	book	Latin	liber, libri	interlibrary, libel, libellant, libellee, libellous, librarian, library, libretto
lig-	bind	Latin	ligare, ligatus	ligament, ligature
limac-	slug	Latin	limax, limacis	limacine, limacoid, limacon, Limax
limpa-	clear, water	Latin	limpa "water"	limpid, limpidity, lymph
line-	line	Latin	linea	align, alignment, ambilineal, ambilineality, bilinear, collinear, collinearity, collineation, curvilinear, curvilinearity, delineate, delineation, delineavit, line, linea, lineage, lineal, lineament, linear, linearity, lineate, lineation, matrilineal, multicollinearity, multilinear, nonalignment, noncollinear, nonlineal, nonlinear, nonlinearity, quasilinear, realign, realignment, rectilinear, rectilinearity, sesquilinear, sublineage, sublinear, supralinear, trilinear, unilinear
line-	smear, smudge	Latin	linere	delete, deletion, indelible, liniment
lingu-	language, tongue	Latin	lingua	bilingual, bilinguality, bilinguous, collingual, elinguation, interlanguage, language, ligula, ligular, ligule, lingua franca, lingual, linguiform, linguine, multilingual, prelingual, quadrilingual, sublingual, trilingual
linqu-, lict-	leave	Latin	linquere, lictus	relict, relinquish
lip-	fat	Greek	λίπος (lípos)	lipolysis, lipophile, lipophilic, lipopolysaccharide, lipoprotein, synaloepha
liqu-	flow	Latin	liquere	deliquesce, liquefy, liqueur, liquid, liquor, prolix
lit-	prayer, supplication	Greek	λιτή (litḗ), λιτανεία (litaneía)	litany
liter-	letter	Latin	littera	alliteration, alliterative, biliteral, biliterate, illiteracy, illiterate, literacy, literal, literary, literate, literati, literatim, literation, literator, literature, multiliteral, nonliteral, nonliterary, nonliterate, obliterate, obliteration, preliterate, quadriliteral, transliteracy, transliterate, transliteration, triliteral, uniliteral
lith-	stone	Greek	λίθος (líthos)	aerolithology, endolith, endolithic, epilithic, lithagogue, lithic, lithography, lithology, lithophile, lithophone, lithophyte, lithosphere, lithotomy, megalith, Mesolithic, microlite, monolith, monolithic, Neolithic, Paleolithic, photolithography, phytolith, regolith, stylolite
loc-	place	Latin	locus, locare	accouchement, allocate, bilocation, bilocular, cislocative, collocation, couch, couchant, dislocate, dislocation, interlocal, lieu, local, locale, locality, locate, location, locative, locator, locomotion, loculament, locular, locule, loculose, loculus, locus, milieu, multilocal, multilocation, multilocular, nonlocal, relocate, relocation, translocate, translocation, translocative, trilocular, unilocular
log-, -logy	word, reason, speech, thought	Greek	λόγος (lógos), λογία (logía)	analogy, anthology, apology, biology, dialogue doxology, ecology, epilogue, etymology, eulogy, geology, ideologue, logarithm, logic, logogram, logopaedics, logophile, logotherapy, meteorology, monologue, morphological, neologism, neurology, philology, prologue, psychology, tautology, terminology, theology, toxicology, trilogy, zoology
long-	long	Latin	longus	allonge, elongate, elongation, longa, longanimity, longe, longeron, longinquity, longitude, longitudinal, longum, lunge, lungo, oblong, prolong, prolongation, purloin
loqu-, locut-	speak	Latin	loqui	allocution, circumlocution, colloquial, colloquy, elocution, eloquent, eloquence, grandiloquent, interlocution, loquacious, loquacity, magniloquent, obloquy, soliloquy
luc-	bright, light	Latin	lūx (genitive lūcis), lucere	elucidate, elucidation, elucubrate, elucubration, lucent, lucid, lucidity, Lucifer (bearer of light), luciferase, luciferin, luciferous, lucifugal, lucubrate, lucubration, luculent, noctilucent, pellucid, pellucidity, relucent, semipellucid, translucency, translucent, translucid, translucidus
lud-, lus-	play	Latin	ludere, lusus	allude, collude, delude, elude, elusive, elusory, illude, illusion, ludicrous, lusory, prelude
lumin-	light	Latin	lumen, luminis, luminare	dislimn, enlumine, illuminable, illuminance, illuminant, illuminate, illuminati, illumination, illumine, intraluminal, limn, lumen, luminaire, luminal, luminance, luminant, luminaria, luminary, lumine, luminescence, luminescent, luminiferous, luminosity, luminous, relumine, subluminal, subluminous, superluminal, transluminal
lu-, luv-, lut-	wash	Latin	luere (see also diluere, fluere and pluere)	abluent, ablution, alluvium, colluvium, deluge, depollute, diluent, dilute, dilution, dilutive, diluvial, diluvian, diluvium, elute, elution, eluvial, elluviation, eluvium, illuviation, illuvium, lutaceous, lutite, pollution
lun-	moon	Latin	lūna	circumlunar, cislunar, demilune, luna, lunar, lunate, lunatic, lunation, lune, lunette, luniform, lunisolar, mezzaluna, mezzelune, plenilunary, semilunar, sublunar, sublunary, superlunary, translunar
lut-	yellow, golden	Latin	lūtum, lūteus	corpus luteum, luteal, lutein, luteinizing hormone, luteous
ly-, lysi-, lyt-	dissolving	Greek	λύειν (lúein), λυτός (lutós), λυτικός (lutikós), λύσις (lúsis)	analyse, analysis, analytic, aparalytic, autolysis, catalyse, catalysis, catalyst, catalytic, cytolysis, dialysis, electrolysis, electrolyte, electrolytic, Hippolyte, hydrolysis, hydrolyte, hydrolytic, lysigeny, lysine, lysis, lysosome, lytic, meta-analysis, palsy, paralyse, paralysis, paralytic, plasmolysis, proteolysis
lyc-	wolf	Greek	λύκος (lýkos)	Lycaon, lycanthropy, lycopersicon, lycoris
