= Mechanophobia =

Fear of machines

- Specialty: Psychology

Mechanophobia is a type of specific phobia that involves the fear of machines or anything mechanical. The phenomenon frequently arises subsequent to traumatic incidents involving machinery, such as limb loss. Industrial machinery, such as shredders, grinders, chainsaws, and overlockers/sergers are particularly potent triggers of this phobia due to their inherent capacity for inflicting significant injury if not handled with caution. It emerged during the nineteenth century as a reaction to the effects of the Industrial Revolution. In the 1931 book Phobia by designer and artist John Vassos, mechanophobia is referred to as an affliction of the sexual incompetent or an economic misfit that view machines as symbols of power or achievement. In the 17 February 1934 edition of the Science News Letter, mechanophobia was described as "a hatred of machines" due to their replacing of human laborers in the workforce.

== See also ==
- List of phobias
