= List of Greek and Latin roots in English/F =

All Latin roots beginning with F

Lists of Greek and Latin roots in English beginning with other letters:
- A
- B
- C
- D
- E
- F
- G
- H
- I
- J
- K
- L
- M
- N
- O
- P
- Q
- R
- S
- T
- U
- V
- X
- Z

== F ==
Root	Meaning in English	Origin language	Etymology (root origin)	English examples
fa-, fa (FA)	say, speak	Latin	fārī, see also fatērī	affable, bifarious, confess, defamation, fable, fame, fascinate, fate, ineffability, infamy, infancy, infant, infantry, nefarious, preface, profess
fab-	bean	Latin	faba	faba bean
fac-, fact-, -fect-, -fic- (FAC)	do, make	Latin	facere, factus	affair, affect, affectation, amplify, artifact, artifice, benefactor, benefice, benefit, confection, counterfeit, defeat, defect, disaffect, edifice, effect, effectible, effection, effective, effectivity, effector, effectual, effectuality, effectuate, effectuation, efficacious, efficacity, efficacy, efficiency, efficient, enface, enfacement, facade/façade, face, facet, facette, facial, faciend, facient, facile, facilitate, facilitation, facilitative, facilitator, facilitatory, facility, facinorous, facsimile, fact, faction, factional, factionary, factious, factitious, factor, factorable, factorial, factory, factotum, factual, fake, fashion, feasible, feat, feature, feckless, fiat, forfeit, infect, inofficious, interoffice, laissez-faire, malefaction, manufacture, modify, nonofficial, office, official, officiant, officiary, officiate, officious, olfaction, omnificence, omnificent, parfait, perfect, perfecta, perfectibility, perfectible, perfection, perfective, perfector, pluperfect, prefect, prefectural, prefecture, prequalification, proficiency, proficient, profit, profitability, profitable, profiteer, profiterole, prolific, qualification, quasiperfect, rarefy, refactorable, refashion, refect, refection, refectory, reinfect, remanufacture, resurface, reunification, sacrifice, scientific, semelfactive, suboffice, subprefect, suffice, sufficiency, sufficient, superficial, superficiality, surface, surfeit, surficial, transfection, trifacial, trifecta, uniface, unifacial, unifactorial, unification
falc-	sickle	Latin	falx, falcis	defalcation, falcate, falciform, falchion, falcon
fall-, fallac-, fals-	false, deceive	Latin	fallere, falsus, fallāx, fallācis	default, fail, fallacious, fallacy, fallible, false, falsetto, falsify, falsity, fault
famili-	a close attendant	Latin	famulus	familiarity, family
fasc-	bundle	Latin	fascis	fajita, fasciculation, fascism
fatu-	foolish, useless	Latin	fatuus	fatuous, infatuation
feder-	treaty, agreement, contract, league, pact	Latin	foederāre, from foedus (genitive foederis); see also fides "faith"	confederacy, confederation, federal, federate, federation
fel-	cat	Latin	fēlēs, fēlis	Felinae, feline
felic-	happy, merry	Latin	fēlīx, fēlīcis	felicity
fell-	suck	Latin	fellāre	fellation
femin-	women, female	Latin	fēmina	femininity
femor-	thigh	Latin	femur (genitive femoris)	femoral, femur
fend-, fens-	strike	Latin	fendere, -fensus	defend, fend, offend, offense
fenestr-	window	Latin	fenestra	defenestration
fer-	wild, fierce	Latin	ferus	feral, fierce
-fer-	to bear, carry	Latin	ferre	aquifer, circumference, confer, conifer, defer, differ, ferry, fertile, infer, Lucifer, offer, prefer, refer, suffer, transfer, vociferous
ferv-	boil, glow	Latin	fervēre	ferment, fervent, fervid, fervor, perfervid
feroc-	fierce	Latin	ferōx, ferōcis	ferocity
ferr-	iron	Latin	ferrum	ferrous
fet-	stink	Latin	fētēre	fetid, fetor
fic-	fig	Latin	fīcus	Ficus, fig
fid-, fis-	faith, trust	Latin	fidēs "faith, trust", from fidere "to trust"	confidante, confidence, confident, diffident, faith, fealty, fidelity, fiduciary, infidel, perfidious, perfidy
fig-, fing-, fict- (FIG)	to form, shape	Latin	fingere "to touch, handle; devise; fabricate, alter, change"	configure, disfigure, effigy, feign, fiction, fictitious, figment, figurine, nonfiction, transfigure
fil-	thread	Latin	fīlum	defile, filament, file, filigree, fillet, profile
fili-	son	Latin	filius	affiliation
fin-	end	Latin	fīnis	affinity, confine, define, final, finale, finance, fine, finish, finite, infinite, refine
find-, fiss- (FID)	cleave, split	Latin	findere, fissus	fission, fissure
firm-	firm, strong	Latin	firmus, firmāre	affirm, confirm, confirmation, firm, firmament, infirm
fistul-	hollow, tube	Latin	fistula	fistula
fix-	attach	Latin	fīxāre, frequentative of fīgere	affix, fix, fixation, fixture, prefix, suffix, transfix
fl-, fla- (FLA)	blow	Latin	flāre, flātus	afflatus, conflate, deflate, flatulence, flatus, flavor, flute, inflate, insufflation, soufflé, sufflate
flacc-	flabby	Latin	flaccus, flaccere	flaccid
flav-	yellow	Latin	flāvus	flavonoid
flect-, flex-	bend	Latin	flectere, flexus	circumflex, deflect, flex, flexible, flexile, flexion, flexor, genuflection, inflect, inflection, reflect, reflection, reflex
flig-, flict-	strike	Latin	flīgere, -flīctus	afflict, conflict, inflict, profligacy, profligate
flor-	flower	Latin	flōs, flōris	floral, florid
flu-, fluv-, flux-	flow	Latin	fluere, fluxus	affluent, confluence, effluent, fluctuate, fluctuation, fluency, fluent, fluid, fluidity, flush, fluvial, flux, influence, influx, superfluous
foc-	hearth	Latin	focus	bifocal, focal, focus
fod-, foss-	dig	Latin	fodere, fossus	fossil
foen-	hay	Latin	foenum	Foeniculum
foli-	leaf	Latin	folium	defoliant
font-	spring	Latin	fōns, fontis	font, fontal, fontanelle
for-	bore, drill	Latin	forāre, forātus	foralite, foramen, foraminifer, perforation
form-	shape	Latin	fōrma	conform, deform, form, formal, formation, formula, formulate, inform, perform, reform, uniform
formic-	ant	Latin	formīca	formaldehyde, formic acid
fornic-	vault	Latin	fornix, fornicis	fornication
fort-	strong	Latin	fortis	force, fort, forte, fortify, fortitude, fortress
fove-	shallow round depression	Latin	fovea	fovea
frag-, frang-, -fring-, fract-	break	Latin	frangere, frāctus	defray, diffract, fractal, fraction, fractious, fracture, fragile, fragment, frangible, fray, infraction, infringe, refract, refractory, refrain
frater-, fratr-	brother	Latin	frāter	fraternal, fraternity
fric-, frict-	rub	Latin	fricāre, frictus	dentifrice, friction
frig-	cold	Latin	frīgere	frigid, frigorific
front-	forehead	Latin	frōns, frontis	confront, frontage, frontal
fruct-, frug-	fruit	Latin	frūx, frūgis; frū̆ctus	fructose, frugivorous
fug-, fugit-	flee	Latin	fugere	centrifuge, fugacious, fugitive, refuge
fum-	smoke	Latin	fūmus	fume, fumigation
fund-	bottom	Latin	fundāre "to found", from fundus "bottom, foundation"	found, founder, foundation, fund, fundament, fundamental, fundamentalism, profound, profundity
fund-, fus-	pour	Latin	fundere, fūsus	confound, diffusion, effusion, effusive, found, fusion, infusion, perfusion, profuse, profusion, refund, suffusion, transfusion
fulmin-, fulgur-	flash	Latin	fulmen "lightning flash"	fulminant, fulminate, fulmination, fulgurite
fung-, funct-	do	Latin	fungī, fūnctus	function, fungibility
fur-, furt-	thief, steal	Latin	fūr (genitive fūris) "thief", fūrāre	ferret, furtive
furc-	fork	Latin	furca	bifurcation
fusc-	dark	Latin	fuscus	fuscous, infuscate, infuscation, obfuscate, obfuscation
