= List of Greek and Latin roots in English/R =

Lists of Greek and Latin roots in English beginning with other letters:
- A
- B
- C
- D
- E
- F
- G
- H
- I
- J
- K
- L
- M
- N
- O
- P
- Q
- R
- S
- T
- U
- V
- X
- Z

== R ==
Root	Meaning in English	Origin language	Etymology (root origin)	English examples
rad-, ras-	scrape, shave	Latin	rādere, rāsus	abrade, abrasion, abrasive, corrade, corrasion, erase, erasure, nonabrasive, radula, radular, raduliform, rase, rash, rasorial, raster, rasure, subradular
radi-	beam, spoke	Latin	radius, radiāre	radiance, radiation
radic-	root	Latin	rādix, rādīcis	eradicate, radical, radix
ram-	branch	Latin	rāmus	ramification, rammel, ramose, ramous, ramulose, ramulous
ran-	frog	Latin	rāna	Rana
ranc-	rancidness, grudge, bitterness	Latin	rancere	rancid, rancor
rap-	rob, seize	Latin	rapere, raptus	arreption, arreptitious, enrapt, enrapture, rapacious, rapacity, rape, rapid, rapidity, rapine, rapt, raptio, raptor, raptorial, rapture, rapturous, raptus, ravenous, ravine, ravish, subreption, subreptitious, surreptitious
rap-	turnip	Latin	rāpum	rapeseed
raph-	sew, seam	Greek	ῥάπτειν (rháptein), ῤαφή (raphḗ)	raphae, raphe
rar-	rare	Latin	rārus	rarity
rauc-	harsh, hoarse	Latin	raucus	raucous
re-, red-	again, back	Latin	re-	recede, redact
rect-, reg-, -rig-	straight, direct	Latin	regere "to direct, lead straight, guide", related rectus "straight, right"	correct, direct, dirigible, erect, erection, ergo, rectangle, rectify, rectitude, rectum, regent, regime, regimen, regiment, region, surge
reg-, rex-	king	Latin	rex (genitive regis)	regal, regency, regicide, Regis, regulation, reign, rex, royal
regul-	rule	Latin	rēgula "to rule"	regular, regulate, regulation, rule
rem-	oar	Latin	rēmus	bireme, trireme
ren-	kidney	Latin	rēnēs	renal
rep-, rept-	crawl, creep	Latin	rēpere, reptus	reptile
resid-	left behind	Latin	residere "remain behind" (see also sedere)	reside, residence, resident, residual, residue
ret-	net	Latin	rēte	reticle, retina
retro-	backward, behind	Latin	retrō	retrograde, retrospective, retrovirus
rhabd-	rod	Greek	ῥάβδος (rhábdos)	Rhabdodon, rhabdoid, rhabdom, rhabdomancy, rhabdomyolysis, rhabdomyosarcoma
rhach-, rach-	spine	Greek	ῥάχις, ῥάχεως (rhákhis, rhákheōs)	rachipagus, rachis, rachischisis, rhachiodont, rhachis
rhag-, rheg-	rend, tear	Greek	ῥηγνύναι (rhēgnúnai), ῥαγίζω, ῥῆξις (rhêxis), ῥῆγμα (rhêgma)	bronchorrhagia, hemorrhage, menorrhagia, regma, rhagades, rhegma, rhegmatogenous, rhexis
rhe-	flow	Greek	ῥεῖν (rheîn), ῥυτός (rhutós), ῥύσις (rhúsis), ῥεῦμα (rheûma), ῥοία (rhoía), ῥυθμός (rhuthmós)	antiarrhythmic, arrhythmia, arrhythmic, diarrhoea, dysrhythmia, endorheic, eurhythmia, eurhythmic, eurhythmy, gonorrhoea, hemorrhea, logorrhea, polyrhythm, rheology, rheometer, rheostat, rheum, rheumatic, rheumatism, rheumatoid, rheumatology, rhythm, rhythmic, rhyton
rhetin-	resin	Greek	ῥητίνη (rhētínē), ῥητινώδης, ῥητινόω	retinite
rhig-	chill	Greek	ῥῖγος (rhîgos)	rhigosaurus
rhin-	nose, snout	Greek	ῥίς, ῥινός (rhís, rhinós)	catarrhine, haplorhine, platyrrhine, rhinoceros, rhinophyma, rhinoplasty, strepsirrhine
rhiz-	root	Greek	ῥίζα (rhíza), ῥιζοῦν (rhizoûn), ῥίζωμα (rhízōma)	ectomycorrhiza, rhizoid, rhizomatous, rhizome, rhizomorph, rhizomorphous, rhizophagous, rhizophagy, Rhizopogon, Rhizopus, rhizosphere
rho-	R, r	Greek	Ρ, ρ, ῥῶ (rhô)	rho, rhotacism, rhotacize, rhotic
rhod-	rose	Greek	ῥόδον (rhódon)	rhododendron, rhodophyte, rhodopsin, rhodophobia
rhomb-	spinning top	Greek	ῥόμβος (rhómbos)	orthorhombic, rhomb, rhombic, rhomboid, rhombus, rhumb
rhynch-	snout	Greek	ῥύγχος (rhúnkhos)	Oncorhynchus, Rhynchobatus, rhynchophore
rid-, ris-	laugh	Latin	ridere "to laugh" (past participle risus)	deride, derision, ridicule, ridiculous, risible
robor-	oak, strength	Latin	rōborāre "to strengthen", from rōbur, rōbus "strength"	corroborant, corroborate, corroboration, corroborative, corroborator, robust
rod-, ros-	gnaw	Latin	rōdere, rōsus	corrode, erosion, rodent
rog-	ask	Latin	rogāre	abrogate, arrogant, arrogate, derogate, derogation, derogatory, interrogation, prerogative, prorogue, rogation, rogue, surrogate
rostr-	beak, prow	Latin	rōstrum	brevirostrate, curvirostral, lamellirostral, rostellate, rostelliform, rostellum, rostral, rostrate, rostriform, rostrulum, rostrum
rot-	wheel	Latin	rota, rotāre	arrondissement, circumrotation, contrarotation, control, controller, decontrol, enroll, enrollee, enrollment, irrotational, multirole, multiroll, redondilla, reenroll, rodeo, role, roll, rondeau, rondel, rondelle, rondo, rotary, rotate, rotation, rotational, rotator, rotatory, rotavirus, rotelle, rotifer, Rotifera, rotiferous, rotiform, rotula, rotund, rotunda, rotundifolious, rotundity, roulette, round, roundel, roundelay, roundlet, rowel, semiround
ruber-, rubr-	red	Latin	ruber	erubescence, erubescent, rubella, Rubio, rubious, rubric, rubricate, rubrication, rubricator, ruby
rudi-	unskilled, rough, unlearned	Latin	rudis	erudite, erudition, rude, rudiment, rudimentary, rudity
rug-	wrinkle	Latin	rūga, rugare	corrugant, corrugate, corrugation, erugate, rugose
rumin-	throat	Latin	rūmen, rūminis	rumen, rumenic acid, ruminal, ruminant, ruminate, rumination, ruminator
rump-, rupt-	break, burst	Latin	rumpere, ruptus	abrupt, abruption, corrupt, corruptible, corruption, corruptor, disrupt, disruption, disruptive, disruptor, disrupture, erumpent, erupt, eruption, eruptive, incorrupt, incorruptibility, incorruptible, interrupt, interruptible, interruption, irrupt, irruption, irruptive, maleruption, noneruptive, reroute, rout, route, routine, rupture, subroutine, supereruption
rur-	countryside, farm	Latin	rūs, rūris	nonrural, roister, roisterous, rural, rustic, rusticate, rustication, rusticity
