= Omophagus =

Scientific classification
- Domain: Eukaryota
- Kingdom: Animalia
- Phylum: Arthropoda
- Class: Insecta
- Order: Coleoptera
- Suborder: Adephaga
- Family: Carabidae
- Tribe: Lebiini
- Subtribe: Dromiusina
- Genus: Omophagus; Andrewes, 1937
- Species: O. artus

Binomial name
- Omophagus artus Andrewes, 1937

Genus of beetles

Omophagus is a genus in the ground beetle family Carabidae. This genus has a single species, Omophagus artus. It is found in India.
