= Osculant =

In mathematics, specifically invariant theory, the osculant or tacinvariant or tact invariant is an invariant of a hypersurface that vanishes if the hypersurface touches itself, or an invariant of several hypersurfaces that osculate, meaning that they have a common point where they meet to unusually high order.
