= List of Greek and Latin roots in English/P–Z =

The following is an alphabetical list of Greek and Latin roots, stems, and prefixes commonly used in the English language from P to Z. See also the lists from A to G and from H to O.

Some of those used in medicine and medical and business technology are not listed here but instead in the entry for List of medical roots, suffixes and prefixes.

== Collation ==
Note that root groups such as "ad-, a-, ac-, af-, ag-, al-, am-, an-, ap-, ar-, as-, at-" are collated under the head item (first item listed), which is sometimes followed by alternative roots that might have collated earlier in the table had they been listed separately (in this example, "a-" and "ac-").

== Roots P–Z ==
Lists of Greek and Latin roots in English beginning with other letters:
- A
- B
- C
- D
- E
- F
- G
- H
- I
- J
- K
- L
- M
- N
- O
- P
- Q
- R
- S
- T
- U
- V
- X
- Z

== P ==
Root	Meaning in English	Origin language	Etymology (root origin)	English examples
pac-	peace	Latin	pax, pacis	appease, Pacific, pacify, pay
pach-	thick	Greek	παχύς (pakhús), πάχος, πάχεος (pákhos, pákheos)	pachydermata, pachyglossia, pachynsis, Pachypodium
pact-	fasten	Latin	pangere "to fix, fasten"	compact, impact, impaction, impinge, page, propagate
pact-	agreement	Latin	pacisci "to covenant, to agree, make a treaty"	pact
pae-	strike	Greek	παίειν (paíein), (paistos)	anapaest, anapaestic, anapest, anapestic
paed-, ped-	child	Greek	παῖς, παιδός (paîs, paidós), παιδικός (paidikós)	orthopedic, paediatric, paedogenesis, paedomorphism, page, pedagogue, pedagogy, pedant, pedantic, pediatric, pedodontics, pedophilia
pagin-	page	Latin	pagina	pagination
pal-	stake	Latin	palus	impale, impalement, pale, palisade, pole, travail, travel
palae-, pale-	ancient, old	Greek	παλαιός (palaiós)	paleo diet, paleobiology, paleobotanic, Paleocene, Paleogene, Paleolithic, paleology, paleomagnetism, paleontology, paleopolyploidy, paleopsychology, Paleozoic
palin-, palim-	back	Greek	πάλιν (pálin)	palimpsest, palindrome, palingenesis, palinspastic
pall-	be pale	Latin	pallere	pallid, pallor
palli-	cloak	Latin	palliare "to cover, cloak", from pallium "cloak"	pall, palliate, palliative, pallium
palm-	palm	Latin	palma	palmate
palp-	touch	Latin	palpare	palp, palpable, palpate, palpation, palpitant, palpitation
palustr-	in marshes	Latin	paluster	palustral
pan-	Pan	Greek	πάειν, Πάν (Pán), Πανικός (Panikós)	panic
pan-, pam-	all	Greek	πᾶς, παντός (pantós), πᾶν (pân), πασῶν, παντότης, πάντοθεν	diapason, panacea, pandemic, pandemonium, panoply, panoptic, pantology, parrhesia
pan-	bread	Latin	pānis	accompaniment, accompany, appanage, companion, company, empanada, impanate, impanation, panelle, panetela, panetella, panettone, panivorous, pannier, pantry
pand-, pans-	spread	Latin	pandere, pansus/passus	compass, dispand, dispansion, encompass, encompassment, expand, expanse, expansion, expansive, expansivity, impassable, impasse, pace, pandiculate, pandiculation, passus, repand, spawn, subrepand
par-, para-	beside, near	Greek	παρά (pará)	parable, parabola, parallel, parallelepiped, parameter, parapagus, paradox, parody
par-	equal	Latin	par	compare, disparage, par, parity, peer, subpar
par-	order, prepare, provide, procure	Latin	parare	apparat, apparatus, co-emperor, comprador, disparate, disrepair, dissever, disseverance, emperor, empery, empire, empress, imperant, imperative, imperator, imperious, inseparable, irreparable, parade, pare, parison, parry, parure, preparation, preparative, preparatory, prepare, repair, reparable, reparation, reparative, separability, separable, separate, separation, separative, separator, separatory, separatrix, sever, severability, severable, several, severance, vituperate
parc-, pars-	spare, save	Latin	parcere, parsus	parcity, parsimonious, parsimony
pariet-	wall	Latin	paries, parietis	parietal
part-	part	Latin	pars, partis	apart, bipartite, compartment, depart, impartial, parcel, part, partial, participate, particle, partisan, partition
parthen-	virgin	Greek	παρθένος (parthénos)	parthenocarpy, parthenogenesis, Parthenon, Parthenope
parv-	little	Latin	parvus	parvovirus, parvorder
pasc-, past-	feed	Latin	pāscere, pāstus	antepast, antipasto, pabulum, pastel, pastern, pastiglia, pastille, pastor, pastorage, pastoral, pastorale, pastorate, pastorium, pasturable, pasturage, pastural, pasture, repast, repasture
pass-	sprinkle	Greek	πάσσειν (pássein), παστός (pastós)	paste
pass-	pace, step	Latin	passus	
passer-	sparrow	Latin	passer	passeriform, passerine
pat-	path	Greek	πάτος (pátos), πατεῖν (pateîn), πατητός, πατητής, πατητήριον	peripatetic, peripateticism
pat-	be open	Latin	patere	impatent, patefaction, patella, patellar, patelliform, paten, patency, patent, patera, patin
path-	feeling, disease	Greek	πάσχειν (páskhein), παθητικός (pathētikós), πάθος (páthos)	allopath, allopathy, antipathy, apathetic, apathy, empathy, etiopathogenesis, homeopathic, homeopathy, idiopathic, pathetic, pathoclisis, pathogen, pathogenesis, pathogenic, pathologist, pathology, pathos, psychopath, psychopathic, psychopathy, sympathectomy, sympathetic, sympathy
pater-, patr-	father	Greek	πατήρ, πατρός (patḗr, patrós), πατριά (patriá), πατριώτης (patriṓtēs)	allopatric, allopatry, eupatrides, patriarch, patriarchy, patriot, patriotic, patriotism, patrology, patronym, patronymic, sympatric, sympatry
pater-, patr-	father	Latin	pater (genitive patris)	compadre, compaternity, compère, impetrate, impetration, impetrative, impetrator, Jupiter, padre, padrone, paterfamilias, paternal, paternity, paternoster, patriate, patriation, Patricia, patrician, patriciate, patricidal, patricide, Patrick, patriclinous, patricliny, patrifocal, patrilateral, patrilineage, patrilineal, patrilineality, patrilinear, patrilocal, patrilocality, patrimonial, patrimony, patron, patronage, patronal, patronate, patroness, patroon, patter, pattern, père, perpetrable, perpetrate, perpetration, perpetrator, repatriate, repatriation
pati-, pass-	suffer, feel, endure, permit	Latin	pati, passus	compassion, compassionate, compatibility, compatible, dispassion, dispassionate, impassible, impassion, impassive, impassivity, impatible, impatience, impatient, incompatibility, incompatible, interpatient, noncompatible, nonpassible, passibility, passible, passion, passional, passionary, passionate, passive, passivity, patible, patience, patient, patientive, perpession
pauc-	few	Latin	paucus	paucal, pauciloquent, paucity
pav-	beat	Latin	pavire	pavage, pave, pavement, pavior
pecc-	sin	Latin	peccatum "sin, fault, error", from peccare "to miss, mistake"	impeccable, peccadillo, peccant, peccavi
pect-	fixed	Greek	πηκτός (pēktós)	pectic, pectin
pector-	chest	Latin	pectus, pectoris	pectoral, expectorate
pecu-	property	Latin	pecunia "property", from pecu "cattle"	peculiar, pecuniary, pecunious
ped-	foot	Latin	pes, pedis	biped, bipedal, centipedal, centipede, decempedal, expediency, expedient, expeditate, expedite, expedition, expeditionary, expeditious, impeach, impeachable, impeachment, impede, impediment, impedition, impeditive, inexpedient, interpetiolar, intrapetiolar, millipede, multiped, multipede, octopede, oppidum, pawn, pedal, pedate, pedatifid, pedestal, pedestrian, pedicel, pedicle, pedicure, pediform, pedigerous, pedigree, peduncle, pedunculate, peon, peonage, petiolar, petiolate, petiole, petiolular, petiolulate, petiolule, piedfort, piedmont, pioneer, quadruped, quadrupedal, repedation, revamp, semiped, semipedal, sesquipedal, stapes, stapedius, subpetiolate, suppedaneum, tripedal, trivet, vamp, velocipede
peg-, pect-	fix	Greek	πηγνύναι (pēgnúnai), πηκτός (pēktós), πηκτικός (pēktikós), πῆξις (pêxis), πῆγμα (pêgma), πάγη (págē), πάγος (págos), πάγιος (págios), παγιότης (pagiótēs), πάσσαλος (pássalos)	hysteropexy, pagophobia, parapagus, pectic, pectin, rheopectic, rheopecty, rheopexy
pejor-	worse	Latin	pejor	pejorative
pel-	clay, mud	Greek	πηλός (pēlós)	pelite, pelitic
pelag-	sea	Greek	πέλαγος (pélagos), πελαγικός (pelagikós)	abyssopelagic, allopelagic, archipelagic, archipelago, bathypelagic, epipelagic, hadopelagic, mesopelagic, pelagic, pelagonym
pelarg-	stork	Greek	πελαργός (pelargós), πελαργώδης	pelargonic, Pelargonium
pell-, puls-	drive, push	Latin	pellere, pulsus	appulse, compel, compulsory, dispel, expel, expulsion, impel, impulse, propel, propellent, propulsion, propulsive, propulsor, pulsate, pulse, push, repel, repellent, repulsive
pemp-, pomp-	send	Greek	πέμπειν (pémpein), πομπή (pompḗ)	apopemptic, hypnopompic, pomp, psychopomp
pen-	almost	Latin	paene	peninsula, penultimate, penumbra
pen-, poen-, puni-	punish	Latin	punire "punish" (earlier poenire), from poena "punishment"	impune, impunity, pain, penal, penalize, penalty, penance, penitence, penitent, penitentiary, pine, punish, punitive, repent, subpoena
pend-, pens-	hang	Latin	pensare, frequentative of pendere	append, penchant, pendant, pending, pendulum, pensive, prepense, suspend, suspense
penia-	deficiency	Greek	πενία (penía)	leukopenia
penn-, pinn-	feather	Latin	penna, pinna	pennate, pinnacle, pinnate, pinnule
pent-	five	Greek	πέντε (pénte), πεντάς, πεντάδος (pentás, pentádos), πεντάκις (pentákis) "five times", πενταπλάσιος (pentaplásios) "five-fold", πενταχοῦ	diapente, pentachoric, pentad, pentagon, pentagram, pentalpha, pentapolis, pentatonic, pentatope, pentode
pentacosi-	five hundred	Greek	πεντακόσιοι (pentakósioi)	pentacosiomedimni
pentecont-	fifty	Greek	πεντήκοντα (pentḗkonta), πεντηκοντάς, πεντηκοντάδος (pentēkontás, pentēkontádos)	pentecontad, pentecontagon
pentecost-	fiftieth	Greek	πεντηκοστός (pentēkostós)	Pentecost, pentecostalism
peper-	pepper	Greek	πέπερι, πεπέρεως	paprika, pepper
pepon-	ripe	Greek	πέπων, πέπονος (pépōn, péponos)	pumpkin
pept-	digest	Greek	πέσσειν (péssein), πεπτός (peptós), πεπτικός (peptikós), πέψις (pépsis)	dipeptide, dyspepsia, dyspeptic, eupepsia, eupeptic, monopeptide, oligopeptide, pepsin, peptic, peptide, peptone, polypeptide, tetrapeptide, tripeptide
per-	wallet	Greek	πήρα (pḗra), πηρίδιον (pērídion)	peridium
per-, pel-	thoroughly, through	Latin	per	pellucid, perfection, permeate, pernicious, persistence, peruse, pervade
peran-	across, beyond	Greek	πέραν (péran)	Perates
perdic-	partridge	Greek	πέρδιξ, πέρδικος (pérdix, pérdikos)	Melanoperdix, partridge
peri-	around	Greek	περί (perí)	Pericles, pericope, perigee, perihelion, perimeter, period, periphery, periscope
persic-	peach	Greek	περσικός (persikós)	
pessim-	worst	Latin	pessimus	pessimal, pessimistic
pet-	strive toward	Latin	petere	appetite, compete, competition, impetus, petition, petulant, propitiate, repeat, repetition
petr-	rock	Greek	πέτρα (pétra)	epipetric, petrify, petroglyph, petrographic, petrography, petroleum, petrology, petrosomatoglyph
phac-	lens	Greek	φακός (phakós)	Phacochoerus, phacoemulsification
phae-, phe-	dark	Greek	φαιός (phaiós)	phaeohyphomycosis, phaeomelanin, pheochrome, pheochromocytoma
phag-	eat	Greek	φαγεῖν (phageîn), φαγία (phagía)	autophagosome, autophagy, bacteriophage, dysphagia, esophagitis, geophagia, hematophagy, macrophage, odynophagia, phagocyte, phagocytosis, phagolysosome, phagophilia, phagophobia, phagosome, phagy, polyphagia, pseudodysphagia, sarcophagus
phalang-	close formation of troops, finger bones	Greek	φάλαγξ, φάλαγγος (phálangos)	aphalangia, phalanges, phalanx
phalar-	having a patch of white	Greek	φάλαρος (phálaros)	phalarope
pharmac-	drug, medicine	Greek	φάρμακον (phármakon)	alexipharmic, pharmaceutics, pharmacodynamics, pharmacogenetics, pharmacogenomic, pharmacokinetics, pharmacology, pharmacophobia, pharmacy
phan-, phen-	to show, visible	Greek	φαίνειν (phaínein), φαντός (phantós), φαινόμενον (phainómenon), φάσις (phásis)	diaphanous, emphasis, epiphany, fantasy, phanerozoic, phantasm, phantom, phase, phene, phenetic, phenology, phenomenon, phenotype, photic, prophase, sycophant, telophase, theophany, tryptophan
pheb-, phob-	fear	Greek	φέβεσθαι (phébesthai), φόβος (phóbos), φοβέω	autophobia, hydrophobia, panphobia, phobophobia
pher-, phor-	bear, carry	Greek	φέρειν (phérein), φορά (phorá), φόρος (phóros)	adiaphora, adiaphorism, anaphor, metaphor, pheromone, phoresis, phoresy, phosphor, prosphora, pyrophoric
pheug-, phyg- (ΦΥΓ)	flee	Greek	φεύγειν (pheúgein), φυγή, φυγάς, φυγάδος (phugás, phugádos) "fugitive", φυγαδικός	apophyge, hypophyge
phil-, -phile	love, friendship	Greek	φίλος (phílos), φιλικός (philikós), φιλεῖν (phileîn), φιλία (philía), φίλτρον (phíltron)	bibliophile, heterophil, hydrophile, paraphilia, philanthropy, philharmonic, philophobia, philosophy, philter, philtre, philtrum
phim-	muzzle	Greek	φῑμός (phīmós), φιμοῦν (phimoûn), φιμωτικός, φίμωσις (phímōsis)	paraphimosis, phimosis, phimotic
phleb-	vein	Greek	φλέψ, φλεβός (phléps, phlebós), φλέβιον	phlebitis, phlebography, phlebosclerosis, phlebotomist, phlebotomize, phlebotomy, thrombophlebitis
phleg-, phlog-	burn, heat, inflammation	Greek	φλέγειν (phlégein), φλέγμα (phlégma), φλόξ (phlóx) "flame"	phlegm, phlegmasia, phlegmatic, phlegmon, phlegmonous, phlogistic, phlogiston, Phlox
phloe-	tree bark	Greek	φλοιός (phloiós)	hypophloeodic, phlobaphene, phloem, phloeophagy
phlog-	fire, flame	Greek		
phob-	fear	Greek	φόβος (phóbos)	acrophobia, arachnophobia, claustrophobia, ergophobia, homophobia, hydrophobia, zeusophobia
phon-	sound	Greek	φωνή (phōnḗ), φωνητικός (phōnētikós), φώνημα (phṓnēma)	acrophonic, acrophony, allophone, antiphon, antiphony, aphonia, aphonic, apophony, archiphoneme, cacophony, diaphony, diplophonia, dysphonia, euphonic, euphonious, euphonize, euphony, heterophonic, heterophony, homophone, homophonous, homophony, hypophonesis, ideophone, idiophone, isophone, logophonetic, megaphone, microphone, misophonia, monophonic, monophony, morphophonology, phonaesthesia, phonaesthetics, phone, phonemic, phonesthemic, phonetic, phonetics, phonics, phonogram, phonograph, phonology, phonophobia, phonosemantics, phonotactics, polyphonic, polyphony, stereophonic, symphonic, symphony, telephonic, telephony
phos-, phot-	light	Greek	φῶς, φωτός (phōtós)	aphotic, biophoton, cataphote, diphoton, euphotic, microphotograph, phosphor, phosphorus, photic, photo, photobiology, photocatalysis, photochromism, photoelectric, photogenic, photogram, photograph, photography, photolysis, photometer, photometric, photometry, photon, photoperiod, photophobia, photophone, photophore, photopic, photoptarmosis, photosynthesis, phototaxis, phototherapy, phototroph, telephoto
phrag- (ΦΡΑΓ)	fence	Greek	φράσσειν (phrássein), φράξις (phráxis), φράγμα (phrágma)	diaphragm
phren-, phron-	mind	Greek	φρήν, φρενός (phrḗn, phrenós)	euneirophrenia, euphrasy, Euphrosyne, frantic, frenetic, frenzy, oneirophrenia, phrenetic, -phrenia, phrenic, phrenitis, phrenology, phronema, phronesis, phronetic, schizophrenia, sophrosyne
phryn-	toad, toad-like	Greek	φρύνη (phrúnē)	Phrynobatrachus
phtheg-	utter	Greek	φθέγγεσθαι (phthéngesthai), φθεγκτός, φθεγκτικός, φθέγξις, φθέγμα, φθέγματος (phthégma, phthégmatos), φθεγματικός, φθόγγος (phthóngos), φθογγή	apophthegm, apophthegmatic, diphthong, diphthongize, monophthong, monophthongize
phyc-	seaweed	Greek	φῦκος, φύκεος (phûkos, phúkeos)	phycology, Phycomyces, schizophyceous
phyl-	tribe	Greek	φύλον (phúlon)	phylogenetics, phylum
phyll-	leaf	Greek	φύλλον (phúllon)	chlorophyll, phyllotaxis
phys-	bladder	Greek	φῦσα (phûsa)	physogastric, physostomous, Triplophysa
physi-	nature	Greek	φύσις (phúsis)	physics, physician
physalid-	bladder	Greek	φυσαλ(λ)ίς (phusal(l)is)	physalis
phyt-	plant	Greek	φύειν (phúein), φυτόν (phutón)	archaeophyte, autophyte, bryophyte, dermatophyte, neophyte, phytonym, phytoplankton
pi-	kind, devout, pity	Latin	pius	expiate, impious, piety, pious, pity
pic-	pitch	Latin	pix, picis	piceous
piez-	squeeze	Greek	πιέζειν (piézein), πιεστός (piestós), πίεσις, πίεσμα, πίεσματος, πιεστήρ	isopiestic, piezochromism, piezoelectric, piezometer
pil-	hair	Latin	pilus	depilatory, epilator
pil-	pillar, ball	Latin	pila	pile, pill, pillar, pillory
pin- (ΠΟ)	drink	Greek	πίνειν (pínein), πῶμα	pinocytosis
pin-	pine	Latin	pinus	pineal gland
ping-, pict-	paint	Latin	pingere, pictus	depiction, picture, pigment
pingu-	fat	Latin	pinguis	Pinguicula, pinguitude
pir-	try	Greek	πεῖρα, πείρας (peîra, peíras), πειρᾶν (peirân), πειρατής (peiratḗs), πειρατικός (peiratikós), (peirāteía), πειράζω, πείρασις, πειρασμός	antipiracy, apeirogon, apeirohedron, piracy, pirate, piratic
pir-	pear	Latin	pirus	piriformis muscle
pisc-	fish	Latin	piscis	Pisces, piscivore
pis-	pea	Greek	πίσος (písos)	pisoid, pisolite
pithec-	ape, monkey	Greek	πίθηκος (píthēkos)	australopithecine, Australopithecus, caenopithecine
plac-	plain, plate, tablet	Greek	πλάξ, πλακός (pláx, plakós)	Aplacophora, placenta, placode
plac-	calm	Latin	placare, placatus	implacable, placable, placate, please, supple
plac-, plea-	please	Latin	placēre, placitus	complacent, complaisant, displease, placebo, placid, plea, please, pleasure
plag-	oblique	Greek	πλάγος (plágos), πλάγιος (plágios), πλαγιότης	plage, plagiocephaly, plagioclase, plagiotropic, playa
plan-	wander	Greek	πλάνος, πλανάομαι, πλανᾶσθαι (planâsthai), (planáein), πλανητός (planētós), πλανήτης (planḗtēs)	aplanetic, aplanogamete, aplanospore, exoplanet, planet, planetoid, planetonym, planoblast, planogamete, planospore, protoplanet
plan-	flat	Latin	plānus	applanate, applanation, aquaplane, complanar, complanate, coplanar, coplanarity, deplanate, deplane, emplane, esplanade, explain, explanation, explanatory, peneplain, pianissimo, piano, pianoforte, plain, plaintext, plan, planar, planarian, planary, planate, planation, plane, planification, planiform, planish, planula, planular, planulate
plang-, planct-	strike, beat; lament, mourn	Latin	plangere, planctus	plangent
plas-	mould	Greek	πλάσσειν (plássein), πλαστός (plastós), πλαστικός (plastikós), πλάσις (plásis), πλάσμα, πλάσματος (plásma, plásmatos), πλάθω (pláthō)	plasma, plastic, plastique, plastochron, plastromancy, plastron, prosoplasia, protoplasm, pseudoplastic, symplast
plat-	flat, broad	Greek	πλατύς (platús), πλατεῖα (plateîa)	piazza, place, plaice, plateau, platitude, platyhelminth, platypus, Platyrrhini, platysma, Platyzoa, plaza
plaud-, -plod-, plaus-, -plos-	approve, clap	Latin	plaudere, plausus	applaud, applause, explode, explosion, implode, plaudits, plausible
ple- (ΠΛΕ)	fill, full	Greek	πιμπλάναι (pimplánai), πλέως/πλέος, πλειότερος, πλειότης, πλήρης (plḗrēs), πληρόω, πλήρωσις (plḗrōsis), πλήρωμα (plḗrōma), πλήθειν (plḗthein), πλῆθος (plêthos), πληθύς, πληθύω, πληθύνω (plēthúnō), πληθυντικός, πληθώρα/πληθώρη (plēthṓra), πληθωρικός (plēthōrikós), πληθυσμός (plēthusmós)	pleroma, plethodontid, plethora, plethoric, plethysm, plethysmograph, plethysmometry
ple-	sail, swim	Greek	πλεῖν (pleîn), πλεῦσις (pleûsis), πλόος	pleon, pleopod, pleuston
ple-, plet-	fill	Latin	plere	complement, complete, deplete, implement, replete, suppletion, supply
pleb-	people	Latin	plebs, plebis	plebeian, plebs
plec-, ploc-	plait, interweave	Greek	πλέκειν (plékein), πλεκτός (plektós), πλεκτικός (plektikós), πλέξις (pléxis), πλέγμα (plégma), πλοκή (plokḗ), πλόκος	plectics, plexogenic, ploce, symplectic, symplectomorphism, symploce
plect-, plex-	plait	Latin	plectere, plexus	perplex
pleg- (ΠΛΗΓ)	strike	Greek	πλήσσειν (plḗssein), πληκτός (plēktós), πλήκτης, πληγή (plēgḗ), πλῆξις (plêxis), πλῆγμα, πλήκτης, πλῆκτρον	apoplectic, apoplexy, cataplectic, cataplexy, hemiplegia, monoplegia, paraplegia, plectrum, pleximeter, tetraplegia
plen-	full	Latin	plenus	plenary, plenitude, plenty, replenish
plesi-	near	Greek	πλησίος (plēsíos), πλησιότης (plēsiótēs)	plesiosaur
pleth-				
pleur-	rib, side	Greek	πλευρά (pleurá), πλευρόν (pleurón)	metapleural, pleura, pleurisy, pleuritis, pleurodynia, pleuron
plic-	fold	Latin	plicare, plicatus	appliance, applicability, applicable, applicant, applicate, application, applicative, applicator, applicatory, appliqué, apply, centuplicate, centuplication, complicacy, complicant, complicate, complication, complice, complicity, conduplicate, conduplication, duplication, explicate, explicit, implicate, implicit, imply, plait, pleat, pliable, pliant, plight, ply, replica, replicate, replication, replicative, replicator, reply, splay, subduplicate, supplicant, supplicate, supplication, triplicate, triplicity
plinth-	brick	Greek	πλίνθος (plínthos)	plinth, Plinthograptis
ploc-				
plor-	cry out, complain	Latin	plorare	deplorable, deploration, deplore, exploration, exploratory, explore, imploration, imploratory, implore
plu-	rain	Latin	pluere, see also pluvia	pluvial
plum-	feather	Latin	pluma	plumage, plumate
plumb-	lead	Latin	plumbum	plumber
plur-, plus-	more	Latin	plus, pluris	double, plural, pluralist, plus, quadruple, surplus, triple
plurim-	most	Latin	plurimus	plurimal
plut-	wealth	Greek	πλοῦτος (ploûtos)	ploutonion, plutarchy, plutocracy, plutocrat, plutolatry, plutomania, plutonomics, Plutus
pne-	blow, breathe, lung	Greek	πνεῖν (pneîn), πνεῦμα (pneûma), πνεύμων (pneúmōn)	anapnograph, anapnoic, apnea, apnoea, dyspnoea, pleuropneumonia, pneumatic, pneumatology, pneumonia, pneumonic, pneumotaxic
pnig-, pnict-	choke	Greek	πνίγειν (pnígein), πνῖγος, πνῖγμα, πνιγμός, πνικτός, πνικτικός	pnictide, pnictogen
po-, pin- (ΠΟ)	drink	Greek	πίνειν (pínein), πόσις, πῶμα	pinocytosis, pinosome, symposium
pod-	foot	Greek	πούς, ποδός (podós), ποδικός (podikós), ποδία (podía), πόδιον (pódion), πέδον (pédon), πεδίον, πέζα	amphipod, antipode, decapod, podiatry, podium, podomancy, podomere, podopaediatric, polyp, polyposis, sympodium, tetrapod, tripod
pogon-	beard	Greek	πώγων, πώγωνος (pṓgōn, pṓgōnos), πωγωνίας (pōgōnías)	pogonia, pogoniasis, pogonology, pogonophobia, pogonotrophy, Triplopogon
poie-, poe-	make	Greek	ποιϝέω, ποιεῖν (poieîn), ποιητός (poiētós) "made", ποιητικός (poiētikós), ποίησις (poíēsis), ποίημα (poíēma), ποιητής (poiētḗs) "maker"	allopoiesis, autopoiesis, onomatopoeia, piyyut, poem, poesy, poet, poetaster, poetic, poiesis
pol-	pole	Greek	πόλος (pólos)	dipole, polar
pole-	sell	Greek	πωλεῖν (pōleîn), πώλησις, πώλης "seller"	duopoly, monopolist, monopolize, monopoly, oligopolist, oligopoly
polem-	war	Greek	πολεμεῖν (polemeîn), πόλεμος (pólemos), πολεμικός (polemikós)	polemarch, polemic, polemology
poli-	city	Greek	πόλις, πόλιος (pólis, pólios), πολίτης (polítēs), πολιτικός (politikós)	acropolis, biopolitics, cosmopolis, cosmopolitan, Decapolis, ecumenopolis, eperopolis, geopolitics, heptapolis, hexapolis, isopolity, megalopolis, megapolis, metropolis, pentapolis, police, policy, polis, politeia, politic, politicize, politics, politologist, politology, politonym, polity, propolis, tetrapolis, Tripoli
poli-	gray, grey	Greek	πολιός (poliós), πολιότης	poliomyelitis, poliosis
poll-	many	Greek	πολλός (pollós)	
pollic-	thumb	Latin	pollex, pollicis	pollicate
pollin-	fine flour	Latin	pollen, pollinis	pollination
poly-	many	Greek	πολύς (polús), πολλός (pollós), πολλότης (pollótēs), πολλάκις (pollákis) "many times", πολλαπλάσιος/πολυπλάσιος, πλείων (pleíōn) "more", πλεῖστος (pleîstos) "most", πολλοστός (pollostós)	hoi polloi, pollakanth, polyadic, polyandry, polygamy, polygon, polyphase, polysaccharide, polytheistic
pomp-				
pomph-	blister	Greek	πομφός (pomphós), πομφόλυξ	podopompholyx, pompholyx
pon-, posit-	put	Latin	ponere, positus	apposite, apropos, component, depose, deposit, exponent, expose, expound, impose, impound, opponent, position, positive, postpone, posture, propone, proponent, proposition, propound, repose
ponder-	weight	Latin	pondus, ponderis, ponderare	ponder, preponderance
pont-	bridge	Latin	pons, pontis	pontiff, pontificate, pontoon
popul-	people	Latin	populus, populare	population, popular, populous
por-	passage	Greek	πόρος (póros), πορεύω, πορίζειν (porízein), πόρισμα (pórisma)	aporetic, aporia, emporium, gonopore, ozopore, polypore, pore, porism, porismatic
porc-	pig	Latin	porcus	porcine, pork
porn-	prostitute	Greek	πόρνη (pórnē)	pornographic, pornography
porphyr-	purple	Greek	πορφύρα (porphúra)	porphyrin, porphyritic, porphyrophobia, porphyry
port-	carry	Latin	portare "to carry", porta "gate"	comportment, deport, export, import, port, portable, portage, portal, porter, portfolio, purport, rapport, report, support, transport
portion-	part, share	Latin	portio	portion, proportion
post-	after, behind	Latin	post	posterior, posterity, postscript
pot-	power	Latin	potere "be powerful", from potis "powerful, able"	despot, impotent, possess, potent, potentate, potential, power
pot-	drink	Latin	potus, potare	potable, potion
potam-	river	Greek	ποταμός (potamós)	autopotamic, hippopotamus, Mesopotamia, potamic, potamodromous, potamology, potamonym, potamophobia, potamoplankton
prag-	do	Greek	πράσσειν (prássein), πράττειν (práttein), πρασσόμενον, πρακτός (praktós), πρακτικός (praktikós), (prāktikḗ), πρᾶξις (prâxis), πρᾶγμα (prâgma)	apraxia, dyspraxia, parapraxis, practic, practice, pragma, pragmatic, pragmatism, pragmatist, praxis
pras-	leek	Greek	πράσον (práson), πράσινος (prásinos) "leek-green", πρασιά	chrysoprase, prasinous, prasinophobia
prat-	meadow	Latin	pratum	
prav-	crooked	Latin	pravus	depravity
pre-	before	Latin	prae	previous
prec-	pray	Latin	precāri "to ask, beg, pray", from prex "prayer"	deprecation, imprecation, pray, prayer, precarious
pred-	prey	Latin	praedari "plunder", from praeda "prey"	depredate, predation, predator, predatory, prey
prehend-, prend-, prehens-	grasp	Latin	prehendere, prehensus	apprehend, comprehend, comprehensive, enterprise, prehensility, prehension, prey, prison, prize, reprehend, surprise
prem-, -prim-, press-	press	Latin	premere, pressus	compress, compression, compressor, depress, depression, depressive, espresso, express, expression, expressive, impress, impression, impressive, imprimatur, imprint, oppress, oppression, oppressive, oppressor, press, pressure, print, repress, repression, repressive, reprimand, suppress, suppression, suppressor
presby-	old	Greek	πρέσβυς (présbus), πρεσβύτερος (presbúteros), (presbutérion)	archpresbyter, presbyter, Presbyterianism, presbyterium, presbytery, priest, protopresbyter
preter-	past	Latin	praeter	preterite, pretermission
preti-	price	Latin	pretium, pretiare	
pri-	saw	Greek	πρίειν (príein), πρῖσις (prîsis), πρίων, πρίονος (príōn, príonos)	prion
priap-		Greek	πριάπος	priapism, Priapus
prim-	first	Latin	primus	coprime, nonprime, prima facie, primacy, primal, primality, primary, primate, prime, primer, primeval, primine, primitive, primogeniture, primordial, primrose, Primula, semiprime, subprimal, subprime
prior-	former	Latin	prior	prior, priority, priory, pristine, repristinate, subprior
prism-	to saw, something sawed	Greek	πρίσμα, πρίσματος (prísma, prísmatos), πρισμάτιον (prismátion)	antiprism, prism, prismatic, prismatoid
priv-	own	Latin	privus, privare, privatus	deprivation, deprive, privacy, private, privateer, privation, privative, privilege, privity, privy, semiprivate
pro-	before, in front of	Greek	πρό (pró), πρότερος (próteros) "former", πρῶτος (prôtos)	prologue, prostate, prow
pro-	for, forward	Latin	pro	procrastinate, propel, propulsion
prob-	worthy, good	Latin	probare "prove to be worthy", probus	approbation, approve, disapprobation, opprobrium, probable, probation, probe, probity, proof, prove, reprobate, reprove
proct-	anus	Greek	πρωκτός (prōktós)	Ectoprocta, Entoprocta, epiproct, hypoproct, paraproct, periproct, proctalgia, proctology
prodig-	waste	Latin	prodigus "wasteful", from prodigere "drive away, waste"	prodigal, prodigality
prodig-	prodigy	Latin	prodigium "prodigy"	prodigious, prodigy
propri-	property; one's own	Latin	proprietas "appropriateness, property, ownership", from proprius "one's own"	appropriate, proper, property, proprietary, proprietor, propriety
pros-	forth, forward	Greek	πρός (prós), πρόσθεν (prósthen), πρόσθιος (prósthios)	prosenchyma, prosophobia, prosthesis, prosthion
prosop-	face	Greek	πρόσωπον (prósōpon)	aprosopia, diprosopus, prosopography, prosoponym, prosopopoeia, prosopospasm
prot-	first	Greek	πρῶτος (prôtos) (Note: Contracted from *πρόατος)	amphiprotic, antiproton, protagonist, protanomaly, protanopia, protein, protist, protocol, proton, protoplasm, prototype, Protozoa
proter-	former	Greek	πρό (pró), πρότερος (próteros), προτερέω	Proterozoic
proxim-	nearest	Latin	proximus, proximare	approximate, proximity
prun-	plum	Latin	prunus	prune
psa-	rub	Greek	ψᾶν (psân), ψαφαρός, ψήχειν, (psēstós)	palimpsest
psall-	pluck	Greek	ψάλλειν (psállein), ψαλμός (psalmós)	psalm, psalmodicon, psalmody, psalter, psaltery, psaltikon
psamath-	sand	Greek		
psamm-	sand	Greek	ψάμμος (psámmos), ψάμαθος (psámathos)	psammite, psammitic, psammoma, psammophile, Psammophis, psammophyte, psammosere, psammous
pseph-	pebble	Greek	ψάω, ψῆφος (psêphos), ψηφίζειν (psēphízein)	isopsephy, psephite, psephitic, psephocracy, psephology
pseud-	false	Greek	ψεύδω, ψεῦδος (pseûdos)	pseudonym
pseud-	false	Greek	ψεύδομαι, ψευδής (pseudḗs)	pseudonym
psil-	bare	Greek	ψιλοῦν (psiloûn), ψιλός (psilós), ψιλότης, ψίλωσις (psílōsis)	epsilon, psilanthropism, psilanthropy, psilocybin, psilosis, psilotic, upsilon
psithyr-	whisper	Greek	ψίθυρος, ψιθυρίζω, ψιθυρισμός	Psithyrisma
psittac-	parrot	Greek	ψιττακός, ψιττακοῦ (psittakós, psittakoû)	psittacine, psittacism, psittacosis
psoph-	noise	Greek	ψόφος (psóphos), ψοφεῖν, ψοφητικός, ψόφησις, ψόφημα, ψοφοειδής	Psophiidae, Psophocichla, psophometer, psophometric
psor-	itch	Greek	ψωρός (psōrós), ψώρα (psṓra), ψωριᾶν (psōriân), (psōríāsis)	psora, psoriasis, psoric, psorosis
psych-	mind	Greek	ψύχειν (psúkhein), ψυχή (psukhḗ), ψυχικός (psukhikós)	hylopsychism, panpsychism, psyche, psychedelia, psychedelic, psychiatry, psychic, psychoanalysis, psychologist, psychology, psychopathic, psychopathy, psychopomp, psychosis, psychotherapy, psychotic, psychoticism
psychr-	cold	Greek	ψύχω, ψυχρός (psukhrós), ψυχρότης	psychroalgia, psychrometer, psychrophile, psychrophilic, psychrophily
pter-	wing	Greek	πτερόν, πτεροῦ (pterón, pteroû), πτέρυξ, πτέρυγος (ptérux, ptérugos), (pterugōtós), πτερίσκος	apterous, apterygote, archaeopteryx, brachypterous, brachyptery, Chiroptera, chiropterologist, Endopterygota, exopterygote, helicopter, hemipterous, heteropterous, homopterous, Neoptera, peripteros, pterodactyl, pteron, pteropod, pterosaur, pterostigma, pterygote, tetrapterous
pterid-	fern	Greek	πτερίς, πτερίδος (pterís, pterídos)	pteridology, pteridophyte, pteridosperm
pto-	fall	Greek	πίπτειν (píptein), πτωτός (ptōtós), πτωτικός (ptōtikós), πτῶσις (ptôsis), πτῶμα, πτῶματος (ptôma, ptômatos)	anaptotic, asymptomatic, apoptosis, peripeteia, peripety, polyptoton, proptosis, proptotic, ptomaine, ptosis, ptotic, symptom, symptomatic, symptosis
ptoch-	poor	Greek	πτωχός (ptōkhós), πτωχότης	ptochocracy, ptochology
pty-	spit	Greek	πτύειν, πτύον (ptúon), πτύσις (ptúsis), πτύαλον	hemoptysis, ptyalin, pyoptysis
ptych-	fold, layer	Greek	πτύσσειν (ptússein), πτύγμα (ptúgma), πτύξ (ptúx), πτυχός (ptukhós), πτυχή (ptukhḗ)	anaptyctic, anaptyxis, diptych, heptaptych, hexaptych, octaptych, pentaptych, polyptych, tetraptych, triptych
pub-	sexually mature	Latin	pubes, puberis	pubescent, pubic
public-	public	Latin	publicus	publication, publicity
pude-	shame	Latin	pudere	impudent, pudendum, repudiate
pug-, pugn-	fight	Latin	pugnare "to fight", from pugnus "fist"	impugn, pugilism, pugnacious, repugnant
pulchr-	beautiful	Latin	pulcher, pulchri	pulchritude
pulmon-	lung	Latin	pulmo, pulmonis	pulmonary
pulver-	dust	Latin	pulvis, pulveris	pulverize
pung-, punct-	prick	Latin	pungere, punctus	acupuncture, expunge, poignant, point, punch, punctual, punctuation, puncture, pungent
pup-	doll	Latin	pupa	pupa, pupate, puppet
pur-	pure	Latin	purare "to purify", from purus "pure"	impurity, pure, puree, purge, purify, purity
purg-	cleanse	Latin	purgare	expurgate, purgatory, purge
purpur-	purple	Latin	purpura	purpurate, purpureal
put-	prune, reckon	Latin	putāre	amputation, compute, dispute, impute, putative, reputation
py-	pus	Greek	πύον (púon), (pyeîn)	empyema, pyemia, pyemesis, pyesis, pyocyst, pyogenesis, pyorrhea, pyorrhoea, pyosis, pyoureter
pyel-	trough	Greek	πύελος (púelos), πυελίς	pyelectasis, pyelitis, pyelogram, pyelography, pyelonephritis, pyeloscopy
pyg-	rump	Greek	πυγή (pugḗ)	callipygian, pygopagus, pygostyle, steatopygia
pyl-	gate	Greek	πύλη (púlē), πυλών, πυλῶνος (pulṓn, pulōnos)	apopyle, micropyle, propylaea, prosopyle, pylon, pyloric, pylorus, tetrapylon, Thermopylae
pyr-	fire	Greek	πύρ, πυρός (púr, purós), πυρά (purá), πυρότης, πυρετός, πυρέττειν	antipyretic, Empyreuma, pyre, pyrite, pyroclastic, pyrolysis, pyromancy, pyromania, pyromaniac, pyrometric, pyrophobia, pyrophoric, pyrosis, pyrosome, pyrotechnic
pyramid-		Greek	πυραμίς, πυραμίδος	dipyramid, pyramid, pyramidion
pyrrh-	flame-colored	Greek	πῦρ, πυρρός, πυρρότης, πυρράζω	pyrrhic

Lists of Greek and Latin roots in English beginning with other letters:
- A
- B
- C
- D
- E
- F
- G
- H
- I
- J
- K
- L
- M
- N
- O
- P
- Q
- R
- S
- T
- U
- V
- X
- Z

== Q ==
Root	Meaning in English	Origin language	Etymology (root origin)	English examples
quadr-	four	Latin	quattuor	quadrangle, quadrennial, quadriceps, quadracycle quadrifarious, quadrifid, quadrifolium, quadrifrons, quadrilateral, quadrilingual, quadriliteral, quadrillion, quadrimester, quadrinational, quadrinodal, quadrinomial, quadrinominal, quadripara, quadrireme, quadrisection, quadrivalent, quadrivium, quadruped, quadruple, quadruplet, quadruplex, quadruplicate, quatrain, quatre, quatrefoil
quadragen-	forty each	Latin	quadrageni	quadragenarian, quadragenary
quadragesim-	fortieth	Latin	quadragesimus	Quadragesima, quadragesimal
qual, quant	of how much	Latin	quantus qualis	quality, qualify, quantity, quantum
quart-	fourth	Latin	quartus	inquartation, interquartile, quadroon, quart, quartal, quartan, quartary, quarte, quarter, quartermaster, quartet, quartic, quartile, quartine, quarto, semiquartile
quasi-	as if, almost	Latin	quasi	quasar, quasiparticle
quatern-	four each	Latin	quaternī	biquaternion, quatern, quaternary, quaternate, quaternion, quaternity, quire
quati-, -cuti-, quass-, -cuss-	shake	Latin	quatere	cassate, cassation, concussion, concussive, conquassate, decussation, discuss, discussion, discussive, discutient, excuss, excussio, excussion, fracas, percuss, percussion, percussive, percussor, quash, quassation, recussion, repercussion, rescue, squash, squassation, subconcussive, succuss, succussation, succussion, succussive
quer-, -quir-, quesit-, -quisit-	search, seek	Latin	quaerere, quaesītus	acquest, acquire, acquiree, acquirement, acquisite, acquisition, acquisitive, acquisitory, conquer, conquest, corequisite, disquisition, exquire, exquisite, inquest, inquire, inquiry, inquisition, inquisitive, inquisitor, inquisitorial, inquisitory, perquisite, perquisition, prerequisite, quaere, quaestor, query, quest, question, questionable, questionary, questionnaire, questor, reconquer, reconquest, request, require, requirement, requisite, requisition, requisitive, requisitor, requisitory
qui-	rest	Latin	quies, quiētus	acquiesce, acquiescence, acquiescent, acquit, acquittal, acquittance, inquietude, quiescence, quiescent, quiet, quietude, quietus, quit, requiem, requiescat
quin-	five each	Latin	quini	biquinary, quinarius, quinary, quinate
quindecim-	fifteenth	Latin	quindecimus	quindecimal
quinden-	fifteen each	Latin	quindeni	quindenary
quinque-	five	Latin	quinque	cinquain, cinque, quinquefoil, quinquennial, quinquennium, quinquepartite, quinquevalent
quint-	fifth	Latin	quintus	biquintile, quint, quinta, quintal, quintan, quintant, quintary, quinte, quintessence, quintessential, quintic, quintile, quintipara, quintus, semiquintile
quot-	how many, how great	Latin	quotiens	aliquot, quota, quote, quoth, quotient, subquotient

Lists of Greek and Latin roots in English beginning with other letters:
- A
- B
- C
- D
- E
- F
- G
- H
- I
- J
- K
- L
- M
- N
- O
- P
- Q
- R
- S
- T
- U
- V
- X
- Z

== R ==
Root	Meaning in English	Origin language	Etymology (root origin)	English examples
rad-, ras-	scrape, shave	Latin	rādere, rāsus	abrade, abrasion, abrasive, corrade, corrasion, erase, erasure, nonabrasive, radula, radular, raduliform, rase, rash, rasorial, raster, rasure, subradular
radi-	beam, spoke	Latin	radius, radiāre	radiance, radiation
radic-	root	Latin	rādix, rādīcis	eradicate, radical, radix
ram-	branch	Latin	rāmus	ramification, rammel, ramose, ramous, ramulose, ramulous
ran-	frog	Latin	rāna	Rana
ranc-	rancidness, grudge, bitterness	Latin	rancere	rancid, rancor
rap-	rob, seize	Latin	rapere, raptus	arreption, arreptitious, enrapt, enrapture, rapacious, rapacity, rape, rapid, rapidity, rapine, rapt, raptio, raptor, raptorial, rapture, rapturous, raptus, ravenous, ravine, ravish, subreption, subreptitious, surreptitious
rap-	turnip	Latin	rāpum	rapeseed
raph-	sew, seam	Greek	ῥάπτειν (rháptein), ῤαφή (raphḗ)	raphae, raphe
rar-	rare	Latin	rārus	rarity
rauc-	harsh, hoarse	Latin	raucus	raucous
re-, red-	again, back	Latin	re-	recede, redact
rect-, reg-, -rig-	straight, direct	Latin	regere "to direct, lead straight, guide", related rectus "straight, right"	correct, direct, dirigible, erect, erection, ergo, rectangle, rectify, rectitude, rectum, regent, regime, regimen, regiment, region, surge
reg-, rex-	king	Latin	rex (genitive regis)	regal, regency, regicide, Regis, regulation, reign, rex, royal
regul-	rule	Latin	rēgula "to rule"	regular, regulate, regulation, rule
rem-	oar	Latin	rēmus	bireme, trireme
ren-	kidney	Latin	rēnēs	renal
rep-, rept-	crawl, creep	Latin	rēpere, reptus	reptile
resid-	left behind	Latin	residere "remain behind" (see also sedere)	reside, residence, resident, residual, residue
ret-	net	Latin	rēte	reticle, retina
retro-	backward, behind	Latin	retrō	retrograde, retrospective, retrovirus
rhabd-	rod	Greek	ῥάβδος (rhábdos)	Rhabdodon, rhabdoid, rhabdom, rhabdomancy, rhabdomyolysis, rhabdomyosarcoma
rhach-, rach-	spine	Greek	ῥάχις, ῥάχεως (rhákhis, rhákheōs)	rachipagus, rachis, rachischisis, rhachiodont, rhachis
rhag-, rheg-	rend, tear	Greek	ῥηγνύναι (rhēgnúnai), ῥαγίζω, ῥῆξις (rhêxis), ῥῆγμα (rhêgma)	bronchorrhagia, hemorrhage, menorrhagia, regma, rhagades, rhegma, rhegmatogenous, rhexis
rhe-	flow	Greek	ῥεῖν (rheîn), ῥυτός (rhutós), ῥύσις (rhúsis), ῥεῦμα (rheûma), ῥοία (rhoía), ῥυθμός (rhuthmós)	antiarrhythmic, arrhythmia, arrhythmic, diarrhoea, dysrhythmia, endorheic, eurhythmia, eurhythmic, eurhythmy, gonorrhoea, hemorrhea, logorrhea, polyrhythm, rheology, rheometer, rheostat, rheum, rheumatic, rheumatism, rheumatoid, rheumatology, rhythm, rhythmic, rhyton
rhetin-	resin	Greek	ῥητίνη (rhētínē), ῥητινώδης, ῥητινόω	retinite
rhig-	chill	Greek	ῥῖγος (rhîgos)	rhigosaurus
rhin-	nose, snout	Greek	ῥίς, ῥινός (rhís, rhinós)	catarrhine, haplorhine, platyrrhine, rhinoceros, rhinophyma, rhinoplasty, strepsirrhine
rhiz-	root	Greek	ῥίζα (rhíza), ῥιζοῦν (rhizoûn), ῥίζωμα (rhízōma)	ectomycorrhiza, rhizoid, rhizomatous, rhizome, rhizomorph, rhizomorphous, rhizophagous, rhizophagy, Rhizopogon, Rhizopus, rhizosphere
rho-	R, r	Greek	Ρ, ρ, ῥῶ (rhô)	rho, rhotacism, rhotacize, rhotic
rhod-	rose	Greek	ῥόδον (rhódon)	rhododendron, rhodophyte, rhodopsin, rhodophobia
rhomb-	spinning top	Greek	ῥόμβος (rhómbos)	orthorhombic, rhomb, rhombic, rhomboid, rhombus, rhumb
rhynch-	snout	Greek	ῥύγχος (rhúnkhos)	Oncorhynchus, Rhynchobatus, rhynchophore
rid-, ris-	laugh	Latin	ridere "to laugh" (past participle risus)	deride, derision, ridicule, ridiculous, risible
robor-	oak, strength	Latin	rōborāre "to strengthen", from rōbur, rōbus "strength"	corroborant, corroborate, corroboration, corroborative, corroborator, robust
rod-, ros-	gnaw	Latin	rōdere, rōsus	corrode, erosion, rodent
rog-	ask	Latin	rogāre	abrogate, arrogant, arrogate, derogate, derogation, derogatory, interrogation, prerogative, prorogue, rogation, rogue, surrogate
rostr-	beak, prow	Latin	rōstrum	brevirostrate, curvirostral, lamellirostral, rostellate, rostelliform, rostellum, rostral, rostrate, rostriform, rostrulum, rostrum
rot-	wheel	Latin	rota, rotāre	arrondissement, circumrotation, contrarotation, control, controller, decontrol, enroll, enrollee, enrollment, irrotational, multirole, multiroll, redondilla, reenroll, rodeo, role, roll, rondeau, rondel, rondelle, rondo, rotary, rotate, rotation, rotational, rotator, rotatory, rotavirus, rotelle, rotifer, Rotifera, rotiferous, rotiform, rotula, rotund, rotunda, rotundifolious, rotundity, roulette, round, roundel, roundelay, roundlet, rowel, semiround
ruber-, rubr-	red	Latin	ruber	erubescence, erubescent, rubella, Rubio, rubious, rubric, rubricate, rubrication, rubricator, ruby
rudi-	unskilled, rough, unlearned	Latin	rudis	erudite, erudition, rude, rudiment, rudimentary, rudity
rug-	wrinkle	Latin	rūga, rugare	corrugant, corrugate, corrugation, erugate, rugose
rumin-	throat	Latin	rūmen, rūminis	rumen, rumenic acid, ruminal, ruminant, ruminate, rumination, ruminator
rump-, rupt-	break, burst	Latin	rumpere, ruptus	abrupt, abruption, corrupt, corruptible, corruption, corruptor, disrupt, disruption, disruptive, disruptor, disrupture, erumpent, erupt, eruption, eruptive, incorrupt, incorruptibility, incorruptible, interrupt, interruptible, interruption, irrupt, irruption, irruptive, maleruption, noneruptive, reroute, rout, route, routine, rupture, subroutine, supereruption
rur-	countryside, farm	Latin	rūs, rūris	nonrural, roister, roisterous, rural, rustic, rusticate, rustication, rusticity

Lists of Greek and Latin roots in English beginning with other letters:
- A
- B
- C
- D
- E
- F
- G
- H
- I
- J
- K
- L
- M
- N
- O
- P
- Q
- R
- S
- T
- U
- V
- X
- Z

== S ==
Root	Meaning in English	Origin language	Etymology (root origin)	English examples
sacc-	bag	Greek	σάκκος (sákkos)	sack
sacchar-	sugar	Greek	σάκχαρ, σάκχαρον (sákkharon)	disaccharide, heteropolysaccharide, homopolysaccharide, lipooligosaccharide, lipopolysaccharide, monosaccharide, oligosaccharide, pentasaccharide, polysaccharide, saccharin, trisaccharide
sacr-, -secr-	sacred	Latin	sacrare, from sacer (genitive sacri)	consecrate, desecrate, sacrament, sacred, sacrosanct
sagac-	wise	Latin	sagax, sagacis	sagacious, sagacity
sagitt-	arrow	Latin	sagitta	sagittal plane, Sagittaria
sal-	salt	Latin	sal, salis, salere, salarium	salary, salinity
sali-, -sili-, salt-	jump	Latin	salire, saltus	assail, assailable, assailant, assailment, assault, assaultive, consilience, desultory, dissilience, dissilient, exult, exultant, exultation, insult, insultation, irresilient, resile, resilement, resilience, resiliency, resilient, result, resultant, salacious, salacity, salience, salient, sally, saltando, saltant, saltation, saltatorial, saltatory, saltigrade, saltire, salto, saltus, sault, sauté, sauteuse, sautille, sautoir, somersault, soubresaut, subsultory, transilience, transilient
salic-	willow	Latin	salix, salicis	salicin
salping-	trumpet	Greek	σάλπιγξ, σάλπιγγος (sálpinx, sálpingos)	endosalpingiosis, hysterosalpingography, salpiglossis, salpinx
salu-	health, welfare	Latin	salus	salubrious, salubrity, salutary, salute
salv-	save	Latin	salvus, salvare	salvage, salvation, salve
san-	healthy	Latin	sanus	insane, insanity, sanatorium, sane, sanitarian, sanitarium, sanitary, sanitation, sanity
sanc-	holy	Latin	sancire (past participle sanctus)	sacrosanct, saint, sanctify, sanction, sanctuary
sanguin-	blood	Latin	sanguis, sanguinis	consanguinity, sanguinary, sanguine
sapi-, -sipi-	taste, wise	Latin	sapere "to have a taste, be wise", related to sapor "taste, flavor"	insipid, insipience, sapient
sapon-	soap	Latin from Frankish	sapo, saponis	saponification
sapphir-	a precious stone	Greek from Hebrew	σάπφειρος (sáppheiros)	sapphire, sapphirine
sapr-	rotten	Greek	σήπειν, σαπρός (saprós), σαπρότης	sapraemia, saprogenic, saprophagous, saprophyte, saprotrophic
sarc-	flesh	Greek	σάρξ, σαρκός (sárx, sarkós)	perisarc, sarcasm, sarcastic, sarcocele, sarcoid, sarcoidosis, sarcoma, sarcophagus, Sarcopterygii, sarcosine, sarcosinemia, sarcosome
sarc-	tailor	Latin	sartor "tailor", from sarcire "to mend"	consarcination, sartor, sartorial, sartorius
sati-	enough	Latin	satis	asset, sate, satiate, satiety, satisfy, saturate
saur-	lizard, reptile	Greek	σαύρα (saúra), σαῦρος (saûros)	dinosaur, Saurischia, sauropod
sax-	rock	Latin	saxum	saxatile, saxicavous, saxicoline, saxifrage, saxifragous
scab-	scratch	Latin	scabere	scabies
scal-	ladder, stairs	Latin	scala	scalar, scale
scalen-	uneven	Greek	σκαληνός (skalēnós)	scalene, scalene muscles, scalene triangle, scalenohedron
scand-, -scend-, scans-, -scens-	climb	Latin	scandere	ascend, ascendency, ascendent, ascension, ascent, condescend, condescendence, condescension, descend, descendent, descension, descent, scansion, transcend, transcendence, transcendent, transcendental
scandal-	snare	Greek	σκάνδαλον (skándalon), σκανδαλίζω (skandalízō)	scandal, scandalize
scap-	shaft	Greek	σκᾶπος (skâpos)	scape, scapus
scaph-	anything hollow, bowl, ship	Greek	σκάφη, σκάφος	Scaphirhynchus, scaphoid bone, scaphopod
scat-	dung	Greek	σκῶρ, σκατός (skôr, skatós)	scatemia, scatology, scatoma, scatomancy, scatophagy, scatoscopy
sced-	scatter	Greek	σκεδαννύναι (skedannúnai), σκέδασις (skédasis), (skedastós), (skedastikós)	heteroscedastic, homoscedastic
scel-	leg, thigh	Greek	σκέλος, σκέλεος (skéleos)	isosceles, triskele, triskelion
scen-	booth, tent	Greek	σκηνή (skēnḗ)	parascenium, proscenium, scene, scenic, scenography
scept-, scop-	look at, examine, view, observe	Greek	σκέπτεσθαι (sképtesthai), σκέψις (sképsis), σκέμμα, σκεπτικός (skeptikós), σκοπεῖν (skopeîn), σκοπός, σκοποῦ (skopós)	Abroscopus, diascopic, diascopy, endoscope, endoscopic, endoscopy, epidiascope, episcope, episcopic, gastroscopy, kaleidoscope, macroscopic, microscope, microscopic, panendoscopy, periscope, periscopic, scope, scopophobia, skeptic, stereoscopic, stereoscopy, stethoscope, telescope, telescopic, Telescopium
schem-	plan	Greek	σχῆμα (skhêma)	schema, schematic, schematism, schematize, scheme
schid- (ΣΧΙΔ)	split	Greek	σχίζειν (skhízein), σχιστός (skhistós), σχίσις (skhísis), σχίσμα (skhísma), σχίζα	diaschisis, diaschisma, schisis, schism, schisma, schismatic, schizocarp, schizogamy, schizogony, schizoid, schizophrenia, schizotrichia
sci-	shade, shadow	Greek	σκιά (skiá), σκιάς	sciamachy, sciaphobia
sci-	know	Latin	scire	conscience, conscious, conscientious, omniscious, omniscient, prescient, science, scienter
scind-, sciss-	split	Latin	scindere	rescind, scissors
scler-	hard	Greek	σκέλλειν (skéllein), σκληρός (sklērós), σκληρότης (sklērótēs)	sclera, sclerectomy, scleredema, sclereid, sclerema, sclerenchyma, sclerite, scleritis, scleroderma, sclerophyll, sclerophyllous, sclerosis, sclerotic, sclerotium, sclerotize
scolec-	worm	Greek	σκώληξ, σκώληκος (skṓlēx, skṓlēkos)	scolex
scoli-	crooked	Greek	σκολιός (skoliós), σκολιότης	scoliokyphosis, scoliosis
scombr-	mackerel	Greek	σκόμβρος (skómbros)	scombrid, scombroid
scop-		Greek		
scot-	darkness	Greek	σκότος, σκότου, σκοταῖος	scotobiology, scotochromogen, scotogenic, scotograph, scotoma, scotoperiod, scotophase, scotophilia, scotophilic, scotophobe, scotophobia, scotophobic, scotophobotaxis, scotopic, scotoscope, scotosis, scototactic, scototaxis, scototherapy
scrib-, script-	write	Latin	scribere, scriptus	describe, inscribe, manuscript, prescribe, scribble, scribe, script, scripture, subscribe
scrupl-	uneasiness	Latin	scrupus "sharp stone"	scruple, scrupulous, unscrupulous
sculp-	carve	Latin	sculpere, sculptus	insculp, resculpt, sculp, sculpsit, sculpt, sculptile, sculptor, sculptress, sculptural, sculpture
scut-	shield	Latin	scutum	scute
scyph-	cup	Greek	σκύφος (skúphos)	scyphoid, Scyphozoa, scyphus
se-, sed-	away, apart	Latin	se	secede, sedition, seditious, seduce
seb-	tallow	Latin	sebum	sebaceous, sebum
sec-, sect-, seg-	cut	Latin	secare	secant, section, segment
sed-	settle, calm	Latin	sedare, sedatus	sedative
sed-, -sid-, sess-	sit	Latin	sedere, sessus	assiduous, insidious, obsession, possess, preside, president, reside, resident, sedentary, sediment, sedimentary, sedulity, sedulous, session, subside, supersede
sedec-	sixteen	Latin	sedecim	sedecimal
seget-	in cornfields	Latin	segetum	
sei-	shake	Greek	σείειν (seíein), σεισμός (seismós), σεῖστρον (seîstron)	aseismic, microseism, microseismic, paleoseismology, seism, seismic, seismogram, seismograph, seismology, seismometer, seismonasty, sistrum, teleseism, teleseismic
selen-	moon	Greek	σελήνη (selḗnē)	paraselene, selaphobia, Selene, selenium, selenocentric, selenography, selenology
sell-	saddle, seat	Latin	sella	sella turcica
sema-	sign	Greek	σῆμα (sêma)	aposematic, asemasia, asemia, asemic, pentaseme, polyseme, polysemic, polysemous, polysemy, semantics, semaphore, semasiology, sematic, seme, sememe, semiotic, tetraseme, triseme
semi-	half	Latin	semis	semiannual, semicolon, semiconductor, semiconscious, semifinal, seminatural
semin-	seed	Latin	semen, seminis	insemination
sen-	old man	Latin	senex, senis	senator, senescent, senile, senility, senior
sen-	six each	Latin	seni	senary
sent-, sens-	feel	Latin	sentire, sensus	assent, consensus, consent, dissent, resent, scent, sensation, sense, sensible, sensitive, sensory, sentence, sentient, sentience, sentiment
sep-	rot	Greek	σήψ (sḗps), σήπειν (sḗpein), σηπτός (sēptós), σηπτικός (sēptikós), σῆψις (sêpsis), σηπία (sēpía)	antisepsis, antiseptic, asepsis, aseptic, sepia, sepsis, septic
sept-	fence, partition, enclosure	Latin	saeptum	transept
sept-	seven	Latin	septem	septennial
septen-	seven each	Latin	septeni	septenary
septim-	seventh	Latin	septimus	septimal, septime
septuagen-	seventy each	Latin	septuageni	septuagenary
septuagesim-	seventieth	Latin	septuagesimus	septuagesima, septuagesimal
septuagint-	seventy	Latin	septuaginta	Septuagint
sequ-, secut-	follow	Latin	sequere, from sequi, see also secutus	consecutive, consequence, ensue, non sequitur, obsequious, prosecute, pursue, second, sequel, sequence, subsequent
ser-	silk	Greek	σήρ (sḗr), σηρικός	sericin, serigraph
ser-	sow	Latin	serere, satus	disseminate, dissemination, insemination, postseason, preseason, sation, sative, season, seasonable, seasonal, semen, semenuria, seminal, seminar, seminarian, seminary, semination, seminiferous
ser-	attach, join	Latin	serere, sertus	assert, assertion, assertive, curviserial, desert, desertion, desertrix, dissert, dissertation, dissertator, exert, exertion, insert, insertion, multiseriate, reassert, reassertion, rectiserial, semidesert, serial, seriate, seriatim, series, sermon, uniseriate
ser-	whey	Latin	serum	serac, serosa, serous, subserous
ser-	late	Latin	sērus	serein, serotine, serotinous, serotiny, soiree
serp-	crawl, creep	Latin	serpere, serptus	serpent
serr-	saw, saw-toothed	Latin	serra, serrare	biserrate, serrate, serration, serrature, serriform, serrulate, sierra, sierran
serv-	save, protect, serve	Latin	servare	conserve, deserve, observe, preserve, reserve, servant, service, servile, servitude, subservient
sesqui-	one and a half	Latin	sesqui	sesquialteral, sesquicentennial, sesquipedal, sesquiplicate, sesquitertian
set-	bristle, hair	Latin	saeta	seta, setose
sever-	stern, strict, serious	Latin	severus	asseverate, asseveration, perseverance, perseverant, perseverate, perseveration, perseverative, persevere, severe, severity
sex-	sexual	Latin	sexus	sexual, sexuality, sex, Sexual Intercourse (abbr. "sex)
sex-, se-	six	Latin	sex	semester, sexangle, sexangular, sexavalent, sexennial, sexennium, sexireme, sexivalent, sexpartite, sexradiate, sextain
sexagen-	sixty each	Latin	sexageni	sexagenarian, sexagenary
sexagesim-	sixtieth	Latin	sexagesimus	Sexagesima, sexagesimal
sext-	sixth	Latin	sextus	bissextile, bissextus, semisextile, sestet, sestina, Sext, sextain, sextan, sextans, sextant, sextary, sextic, sextile, sextillion, siesta, sixte
sibil-	hiss	Latin	sibilus, sibilare	sibilance
sicc-	dry	Latin	siccare "to dry", from siccus "dry, thirsty"	desiccate, desiccation, sec, siccative
sicy-	cucumber	Greek	σίκυος (síkuos)	Sicyos
sider-	iron	Greek	σίδηρος (sídēros), σιδήρεος	siderodromophobia, siderophile
sider-	star	Latin	sidus, sideris	sidereal
sigm-	S, s	Greek	σίγμα, σῖγμα (sîgma)	sigma, sigmatism, sigmatropic, sigmoid, sigmoidoscopy
sign-	sign	Latin	signum	design, designate, insignia, signal, signature, significant
sil-	quiet or still	Latin	silere	silence
silv-, sylv-	forest	Latin	silva, sylva	silviculture, sylvan, sylvatic
simi-	ape, monkey	Latin	simia	simian
simil-, simul-	likeness, imitating	Latin	simulare "to emulate", from similis "alike"	assimilate, dissimilate, dissemble, ensemble, resemble, semblance, similar, similarity, simile, similitude, simulacrum, simular, simulate, simulation, simulator, simultaneous, verisimilar, verisimilitude
sinap-	mustard	Greek	σίναπι (sínapi), (sināpízein), (sināpismós)	sinapine, sinapism
singul-	one each	Latin	singulus	singular
sinistr-	left	Latin	sinister, sinistri	sinistral
sin-	China, Chinese	Latin	Sina	sinology, Sinanthropus
sinu-	(to draw) a line	Latin	sinuare	insinuate
sinus-	hollow, bay	Latin	sinus	sinusoidal
siop-	silence	Greek	σιωπή (siōpḗ), σιωπᾶν (siōpân), σιωπητέος (siōpētéos), σιώπησις (siṓpēsis)	aposiopesis, aposiopetic
siph-	tube	Greek	σίφων (síphōn)	siphon, siphonoglyph
sist-	cause to stand	Latin	sistere	assist, consist, desist, exist, insist, persist, resist, solstice, subsist
sit-	food, grain, wheat	Greek	σῖτος, σίτου (sîtos, sítou)	ectoparasite, endoparasite, endoparasitoid, epiparasite, hyperparasitism, kleptoparasitism, mesoparasite, parasite, parasitic, parasitism, parasitoid, sitology, syssitia
siz-	hiss	Greek	σίζω, σίξις (síxis)	
smaragd-	emerald	Greek	σμάραγδος (smáragdos), σμαράγδινος (smarágdinos)	smaragdine
smil-	carving knife	Greek	σμίλη (smílē), σμιλεύω, σμιλευτός, σμίλευμα	smilodon
soci-	group	Latin	socius, sociare	associate, association, associative, consociate, consociation, consociational, disassociate, disassociation, dissociable, dissocial, dissociate, dissociation, dissociative, interassociation, nonassociative, sociability, sociable, social, sociality, societal, society
sol-	sun	Latin	sol, solis	circumsolar, extrasolar, insolate, insolation, solar, solarium, soliform, soliscence, solstice, subsolar
sol-	comfort, soothe	Latin	solari	consolation, console, solace
sol-	alone, only	Latin	solus	desolate, desolation, desolatory, saudade, sole, soliloquy, solitaire, solitary, solitude, solitudinarian, solitudinous, solivagous, solo, sullen
sole-	accustomed	Latin	solere "be accustomed"	insolence, insolent, obsolescence, obsolescent, obsolete
solen-	channel, pipe	Greek	σωλήν (sōlḗn)	solenocyte, solenodon, solenogaster, solenoid, Solenopsis
solv-, solut-	loosen, set free	Latin	solvere, solutus	absolute, absolve, dissolute, dissolve, resolute, resolve, soluble, solute, solution, solve, solvent
soma-	body	Greek	σῶμα, σώματος (sôma, sṓmatos)	allosome, asomatous, autosome, centrosome, chromosome, decasomy, disomic, disomy, episome, gonosome, heptasomy, heterochromosome, heterodisomic, heterodisomy, hexasomy, isodisomic, isodisomy, macrosomia, metasomatic, metasomatism, microsome, microsomia, monosome, monosomic, monosomy, pentasomic, pentasomy, plasmosome, polysomic, polysomy, pyrosome, somatic, somatomancy, somatoparaphrenia, somatopleure, somatotype, somite, tetrasomic, tetrasomy, trisomic, trisomy
somn-	sleep	Latin	somnus	insomnia, somnambulist, somnifacient, somniferous, somnific, somniloquy, somnolent
somni-	dream	Latin	somnium	somnial
son-	sound	Latin	sonus	absonant, ambisonic, assonance, assonant, assonate, consonance, consonant, consonous, dissonance, dissonant, inconsonance, inconsonant, infrasonic, infrasound, magnisonant, resonance, resonant, resonate, resound, sonance, sonant, sonata, sondage, sonnet, sonorant, sonority, sound, subsonic, supersonic, triconsonantal, ultrasonic, ultrasound
soph-	wise	Greek	σοφός (sophós), σοφία (sophía), σόφισμα (sóphisma), σοφισμός (sophismós)	antisophism, pansophism, pansophist, pansophy, philosophize, philosophy, sophism, sophist, sophistry, sophisticate, Sophocles, sophomania, sophomaniac, sophomore, sophomoric
sopor-	deep sleep	Latin	sopor	sopor, soporific
sorb-, sorpt-	suck	Latin	sorbere	absorb, absorbency, absorbent, absorption, absorptive, absorptivity, adsorb, adsorbent, adsorption, exsorption, insorption, malabsorption, resorb, resorption, resorptive, sorbent, sorbile, sorbition, sorption
sord-	dirt	Latin	sordere, sordes	sordes, sordid
soror-	sister	Latin	soror	cousin, sororal, sororate, sororicide, sorority
spa-	draw, pull	Greek	σπᾶν (spân), σπάσις (spásis), σπασμός (spasmós), σπάσμα (spásma), σπαστικός (spastikós), σπώμενον (spṓmenon), σπάδιξ (spádix), σπαδίζω	antispasmodic, palinspastic, perispomenon, properispomenon, spadix, spasm, spasmatic, spasmodic, spasmogenic, spasmolytic, spastic, spasticity
spad-	eunuch	Greek	σπάδος (spádos), σπάδων (spádōn), σπαδοειδής	epispadias, hypospadias
sparg-, -sperg-, spars-, -spers-	scatter, sprinkle	Latin	spargere	asperse, aspersion, aspersive, dispersal, disperse, dispersion, dispersive, insperse, inspersion, interspersal, intersperse, interspersion, nonaspersion, nondispersive, nonsparse, sparge, spargefaction, sparse, sparsity
spath-	blade	Greek	σπάθη (spáthē)	spade, spatha, spathe, spay
spati-	space	Latin	spatium	interspace, interspatial, space, spatial, spatiate, subspace
spec-, -spic-, spect-	look	Latin	perspicuus, specere, spectare, speculari	aspect, aspectual, auspicate, auspice, auspicious, biaspectual, bispecific, bispecificity, circumspect, circumspection, circumspective, conspecific, conspecificity, conspectus, conspicuous, despection, despicable, despiciency, despise, despite, disrespect, disrespectable, especial, expect, expectancy, expectant, expectation, inauspicious, incircumspect, inconspicuous, infraspecific, inspect, inspection, inspector, inspeximus, interspecies, interspecific, intraspecies, intraspecific, introspection, introspective, irrespective, multispecific, multispecificity, multispectral, nonspecific, perspective, perspicacious, perspicuity, perspicuous, prospect, prospective, prospector, prospectus, prospicience, prospicient, reinspect, respect, respectability, respectable, respectant, respective, respite, retrospection, retrospective, special, speciality, speciation, specie, species, specific, specification, specificity, specimen, speciosity, specious, spectacle, spectacular, spectacularity, spectant, spectation, spectator, spectatorial, spectral, spectre, spectrum, specular, speculate, speculation, speculative, speculator, speculatory, speculum, spice, spite, subspeciality, subspecies, suspect, suspicion, suspicious, transpicuous, trispecific, unispecific
speir-, spor-	sow	Greek	σπείρω (speírō), σπαρτός, σπορά, σποράς, σποράδος (sporás, sporádos), σποραδικός (sporadikós), σπόρος (spóros)	aplanospore, archesporium, carpospore, chlamydospore, diaspora, diaspore, endospore, esparto, eusporangium, exospore, heterosporous, heterospory, homosporous, isosporous, leptosporangium, megasporangium, megaspore, microsporangium, microspore, mitospore, sporadic, sporangiospore, sporangium, spore, sporocarp, sporophyte, teliospore, tetraspore, tetrasporophytic, zygospore
spele-	cavern	Greek	σπέος (spéos), σπήλαιον (spḗlaion)	speleogen, speleogenesis, speleology, Speleomantes, speleomorphology, speleoseismite, speleothem, speleotherapy
spelyng-	cave	Greek	σπῆλυγξ, (spêlynx, spēlyng-)	spelunk
spend-, spond-	pledge, promise	Greek	σπένδειν (spéndein), σπονδή, σπονδάς (spondḗ, spondás), σπονδεῖος, σπονδικός	spondaic, Sponde, spondee
sper-	hope	Latin	spes, sperare	despair, desperado, desperate, desperation, esperance, prosper, prosperity, prosperous
sperm-	seed	Greek	σπέρμα, σπέρματος (spérma, spérmatos)	angiosperm, endosperm, gymnosperm, perisperm, sperm, spermatid, spermatocyte, spermatogenesis, spermatogonium, spermatozoon, stenospermocarpy
sphal- (ΣΦΑΛ)	cause to fall	Greek	σφάλλειν (sphállein), σφαλερός (sphalerós), σφαλλόμενον	sphalerite, sphaleron
sphen-	wedge	Greek	σφήν, σφηνός (sphḗn, sphēnós)	sphenic, Sphenodon, sphenoid
spher-	ball	Greek	σφαῖρα (sphaîra)	aspheric, hemisphere, hypersphere, mesosphere, pseudosphere, sphere, spherics, spheroid, spherometer, spherulite, stratosphere, trimetasphere, troposphere
sphing-, sphinct-	strangle	Greek	σφίγγειν (sphíngein), Σφίγξ sphings, σφιγκτήρ	sphincter
sphondyl-	vertebra	Greek	σφόνδυλος, σφονδύλου (sphóndulos, sphondúlou)	spondylitis, spondylolisthesis, spondylolysis, spondylosis, Temnospondyli
sphrag-	seal	Greek	σφραγίς (sphragís), (sphragistikós), σφραγίζω	sphragistic
sphyg-	pulse	Greek	σφύζειν (sphúzein), σφυγμός (sphugmós), (sphugmikós), (sphúxis)	asphyxia, sphygmic, sphygmochronograph, sphygmograph, sphygmomanometer, sphygmus
spic-	spike	Latin	spica	spica, spicate, spicose, spicosity, spicular, spiculate, spicule, spiculiform
spin-	thorn	Latin	spina	infraspinate, infraspinatus, interspinal, spinal, spine, spinel, spinescent, spiniferous, spiniform, spinose, spinous
spir-	breathe	Latin	spirare	aspire, conspire, expire, inspire, perspire, respiration, spirit
splen-	spleen	Greek	σπλήν (splḗn), splēnikós	asplenia, hypersplenism, hyposplenia, polysplenia, splenectomy, splenic, splenitis, splenoid, splenomegaly
spond-	Greek			
spond-, spons-	a surety, guarantee; give assurance, promise solemnly	Latin	spondere, sponsus	correspond, correspondence, correspondent, corresponsive, cosponsor, despond, despondency, despondent, desponsage, desponsate, desponsation, disespouse, espousage, espousal, espouse, interspousal, irresponsibility, irresponsible, irresponsive, nonresponsive, respond, respondee, respondence, respondent, response, responsibility, responsible, responsion, responsive, responsivity, riposte, sponsal, sponsion, sponsional, sponsor, spousal, spouse
spondyl-	vertebra	Greek	σπόνδυλος (spóndulos)	platyspondyly, spondylid, spondylolisthesis, spondylolysis, spondylopyosis, spondyloschisis, spondylosis, spondylosyndesis, Spondylus
spor-	Greek			
spu-, sput-	spew, spit	Latin	spuere	exspuition, sputum
squal-	scaly, dirty, filthy	Latin	squalere	squalid, squalidity, squalor
squam-	scale	Latin	squama	squamous
squarros-	spreading at tips	Latin	squarrosus	squarrose
st- (ΣΤΑ)	cause to stand	Greek	ἵστημι histēmi, histánai, στατικός, στάσις, στατήρ, στήλη	acrostatic, actinostele, anastasis, antistatic, apostasy, apostate, astasia, astasis, astatic, astatine, catastasis, chronostasis, diastase, diastasis, diastatic, diasystem, ecstasy, ecstatic, epistasis, episteme, epistemic, epistemology, eustasis, eustatic, eustele, haplostele, homeostasis, homeostatic, hydrostatic, hypostasis, hypostasize, hypostatic, hypostatize, mesostatic, metastasis, metastasize, metastatic, metasystem, orthostates, orthostatic, protostele, stasimon, stasis, stater, static, statoblast, statocyst, statolith, stela, stele, systasis, system, systematic, systematize, systematology, systemic, teleutostatic
st-	stand	Latin	stare "to stand", also causative form statuere "to enact, set", from status "condition, position"	antestature, arrest, arrestant, arrestee, bistability, bistable, bistate, circumstance, circumstantial, consist, constable, constabulary, constancy, constant, constitute, consubstantiation, contrast, distance, distant, equidistance, equidistant, establish, estate, extant, inconstancy, inconstant, instability, instance, instant, obstacle, presto, stable, stamen, stamina, stance, stanchion, stanza, state, station, stationary, statistic, statue, status, staunch, stay, substance, substantial, substantiality, substantiate, substantiation, substantive, substate, substation, substitute, superstation, superstition, superstitious, transubstantiate, transubstantiation, tristate
stagn-	pool of standing water	Latin	stagnare	stagnant
stala-	dripping, trickling	Greek	σταλακτός (stalaktós) and σταλαγμός (stalagmós), both from σταλάζειν (stalázein) "to drip"	stalactite, stalagmite
stann-	tin	Latin	stannum	stannous
staphyl-	bunch of grapes	Greek	σταφυλή (staphulḗ)	staphyledema, staphylion, staphylococcus, staphyloderma, staphyloplasty
statu-, -stitu-	stand	Latin	statuere	institution, statute
steat-	fat, tallow	Greek	στέαρ, στέατος (stéar, stéatos)	stearic acid, steatolysis, steatolytic, steatosis
steg-	cover	Greek	στέγειν, στέγη (stégē), στεγανός (steganós)	steganography, steganopod, Stegosaurus
stell-, stol-	send	Greek	στέλλω (stéllō), στάλσις (stálsis), στολή (stolḗ)	apostle, centrostaltic, diastole, epistle, epistolic, epistolize, epistolography, eusystole, hypodiastole, peristalsis, peristaltic, peristole, stole, systaltic, systole
stell-	star	Latin	stella	constellate, constellation, stellar
sten-	stand	Greek	στεναί (stenaí)	apostasy, apostate
sten-	narrow	Greek	στενός (stenós)	stenography, stenosis
stere-	solid	Greek	στερεός (stereós)	allosteric, stereochemistry, stereochromy, stereographic, stereography, stereoisomer, stereometry, stereophonic, stereopsis, stereoscope, stereoscopy, stereotaxis, stereotomy, stereotype, stereotypic, steric
stern-	breastbone	Greek	στέρνον (stérnon)	metasternum, prosternum, sternum
stern-, strat-	spread, strew	Latin	sternere, stratus	consternation, prostrate, stratify, stratum, stratus, street
steth-	chest	Greek	στῆθος (stêthos)	stethoscope
sthen-	strength	Greek	σθένος (sthénos)	asthenia, asthenosphere, callisthenics, hyposthenia, sthène, sthenia
stich-	line, row	Greek	στείχειν (steíkhein), στίχος (stíkhos)	acrostic, cadastre, distich, distichous, haplostichous, hemistich, heptastich, monostich, monostichous, orthostichy, pentastich, polystichia, polystichous, stich, stichic, stichomancy, stichometry, stichomythia, telestich
stich-	tunic	Greek	στίχη (stíkhē), στιχάριον (stikhárion)	sticharion
stig-	mark, puncture	Greek	στίζειν (stízein), στίξις (stíxis), στίγμα, στίγματος (stígma, stígmatos)	anastigmat, anastigmatic, astigmatic, astigmatism, stigma, stigmata, stigmatic
still-	drip	Latin	stilla, stillare	distillation, instill
stimul-	goad, rouse, excite	Latin	stimulus	stimulate
stin-	stand	Latin	stinare	destination, obstinate
stingu-, stinct-	apart	Latin	stinguere	distinction, distinguish
stoch-	aim	Greek	στόχος (stókhos), στοχαστικός (stokhastikós), στόχασμα	stochastic
stom-	mouth	Greek	στόμα, στόματος (stóma, stómatos)	anastomosis, anastomotic, deuterostome, monostomous, ozostomia, pentastomid, protostome, stoma, stomach, stomatalgia, stomatic, stomatoplasty, -stome
stor- (ΣΤΟΡ)	spread, strew	Greek	στορέννυμι (storénnumi), στόρνυμι, στρῶμα (strôma)	biostrome, stroma
strat-	army	Greek	στρατός (stratós), στρατηγία (stratēgía)	stratagem, strategic, strategist, strategus, strategy, stratocracy, stratography, stratonic
streper-	noise	Latin	strepere	obstreperous
streph-, stroph-, strob-, stromb-	turn	Greek	στρέφειν (stréphein), στρεπτός (streptós), στροφή (strophḗ)	anastrophe, antistrophe, apostrophe, boustrophedon, catastrophe, catastrophic, catastrophism, epistrophe, monostrophe, monostrophic, strophe, strophic
strept-	twisted	Greek	στρέφειν, στρεπτός (streptós), στρεψίς (strepsís)	Strepsiptera, strepsirrhine, streptococcus
strig-	compress	Latin	strix, strigis	strigogyps
strigos-	having stiff bristles	Latin	strigosus from striga	strigose
string-, strict-	tight, upright, stiff	Latin	stringere, strictus	astringent, constrain, constrict, constringe, restrict, strain, strict, stringent
stroph-	turn	Greek		
stru-, struct-	to make up, build	Latin	struere, structus	construct, construction, construe, destroy, destruct, instruct, obstruct, structure
stud-	dedication	Latin	studere	étude, student
stup-	wonder	Latin	stupere	stupid, stupor
styg-	Styx	Greek	Στύξ, Στυγός (Stúx, Stugós), Στύγιος	Stygian, stygiophobia
styl-	column, pillar	Greek	στῦλος (stûlos), στυλόω (stulóō)	amphiprostyle, amphistyly, anastylosis, araeostyle, araeosystyle, blastostyle, diastyle, epistyle, eustyle, hexastyle, hyostyly, hypostyle, monostylous, octastyle, orthostyle, peristyle, prostyle, pycnostyle, stylite, Stylites, stylobate, styloid, stylolite, stylus, systyle
su-, sut-	sew	Latin	suere, sutus	couture, suture
suad-, suas-	urge	Latin	suadere, suasus	persuasion
suav-	sweet	Latin	suavis	assuage, suave, suavity
sub-, su-, suf-, sug-, sup-, sus-	below	Latin	sub	submarine, submerge, suffix, suggest, support
subter-	under	Latin	subter	subterfuge
sucr-	sugar	Latin	succarum	sucrose
sud-	sweat	Latin	sudare	exudate, exude, sudarium, sudoriferous, transudate
sui-	self	Latin	sui	sui generis, suicide
sulc-	furrow	Latin	sulcus	sulcus
sum-	sum	Latin	summare "to sum up", from summa "sum"	consummate, consummation, sum, summa cum laude, summary, summation
sum-, sumpt-	take	Latin	sumere, sumptus	assume, assumption, consume, consumption, presumption, subsume
super-	above, over	Latin	super	insuperable, soprano, sovereign, summit, superable, superb, supercilious, supercomputer, superficial, superfluous, superimpose, superior, superlative, supermarket, supernal, supernatural, supernova, superposition, superpower, superscript, supersede, supersonic, superstition, supervene, supervise, supreme, supremum, surname, surplus, surround, survive
supin-	lying back	Latin	supinus	supination, supine
supra-	above, over	Latin	supra	supranationalism
surd-	deaf	Latin	surdus	absurdity
surg-	rise	Latin	surgere	insurgent, insurrection, resurgent, resurrection
sybar-	Sybaris	Greek	Σύβαρις, συβάρεως, Συβαρίτης Sybarī́tēs, Συβαριτικός	Sybarite, sybaritic, sybaritism
syc-	fig	Greek	συκῆ, σῦκον (sûkon)	sycomancy, sycophant
syn-, sy-, syg-, syl-, sym-, sys-	with	Greek	σύν (sún)	syllogism, symbol, symmetry, sympathy, synonym, synchronous, system
syring-	pipe	Greek	σύριγξ, σύριγγος (súrinx, súringos)	syringe, Syringodea, Syringoderma, Syringogaster, syringoma, syringomyelia, syrinx

Lists of Greek and Latin roots in English beginning with other letters:
- A
- B
- C
- D
- E
- F
- G
- H
- I
- J
- K
- L
- M
- N
- O
- P
- Q
- R
- S
- T
- U
- V
- X
- Z

== T ==
Root	Meaning in English	Origin language	Etymology (root origin)	English examples
tac-, -tic-	be silent	Latin	tacere, tacitus	reticent, reticence, tacit, taciturn
tach-	swift	Greek	ταχύς (takhús), τάχος (tákhos)	tachometer, tachycardia, tachyrhythmia, tachytelic
taeni-	ribbon	Greek	τείνειν (teínein), ταινία (tainía), ταινίδιον (tainídion)	diplotene, leptotene, pachytene, taenia, taenidia, taenidium, taeniodont, Taeniolabis, zygotene
tag-, tax- (ΤΑΓ)	arrange, order	Greek	τάσσειν (tássein), τακτός (taktós), τακτικός (taktikós), τάξις (táxis), τάγμα (tágma)	ataxia, chemotaxis, epitaxis, eutaxy, hypotaxis, magnetotaxis, metasyntactic, parataxis, phonotactic, phonotactics, phototaxis, rheotaxis, syntactic, syntagma, syntagmatic, syntax, tactic, tagma, taxis, taxonomy, thermotaxis
tal-	ankle	Latin	talus	talus
tang-, -ting-, tact-, tag-	touch	Latin	tangere (past participle tactus)	attain, contact, contagious, contingent, contingency, contiguous, intact, tactile, tangent, tangible
tapet-	carpet	Latin	tapete, tapetis	tapestry, tapetum, tapis
tarac- (ΤΑΡΑΧ)	stir	Greek	ταράσσειν (tarássein), ταρακτός, ταρακτικός, τάραγμα, θράσσω	ataractic, ataraxia
tard-	slow	Latin	tardus	retard, tardigrade, tardy
tars-	ankle	Greek	ταρσός (tarsós, "a flat basket")	metatarsus, tarsal, tarsoclasis, tarsometatarsus, tarsus
taur-	bull	Greek	ταῦρος (taûros)	Minotaur, taurobolium, taurocholic, tauromachy
taur-	bull	Latin	taurus	Taurus
tec- (ΤΑΚ)	melt	Greek	τήκειν	eutectic, eutectoid
tec-, toc- (ΤΕΚ)	childbirth	Greek	τίκτειν, τόκος (tókos)	ditokous, dystocia, embiotocid, monotocous, teknonymous, teknonymy, tokophobia
techn- (ΤΕΚ)	art, skill	Greek	τίκτειν (tíktein), τέχνη (tékhnē), τέκτων, τέκτονος (téktōn, téktonos), τεκτονικός (tektonikós)	architect, polytechnic, techne, technique, technocracy, technocrat, technogaianism, technology, technophilia, technophobia, tectonic
tecn- (ΤΕΚ)	child	Greek	τίκτω, τέκνον, τέκνου (téknon, téknou)	teknonymous, teknonymy
teg-, tect-	cover	Latin	tegere, tectus	contection, detect, detectable, detection, detective, detector, integument, integumentary, obtect, pretectal, pretectum, protect, protection, protective, protector, protectorate, protectory, protectress, protectrix, protégé, protégée, tectrix, tectum, tegmen, tegmental, tegula, tegular, tegument, tile, tog, toga, togate, togavirus, toggery
tele-	far, end	Greek	τῆλε (têle)	telegram, telegraph, telemetry, telepathy, telephone, telescope, television
tele-	complete	Greek	τέλος, τέλεος (télos, téleos), τέλεσις (télesis)	atelectasis, ateleiosis, atelophobia, teleology, telesis, toll
tem-, tom- (ΤΕΜ)	cut	Greek	τέμνειν (témnein), τομός (tomós), τόμος (tómos), τομή (tomḗ), τμῆσις (tmêsis)	acrotomophilia, anatomy, apotemnophilia, atom, atomic, autotomy, diatom, dichotomous, dichotomy, ectomy, entomology, entomomancy, entomophagous, entomophilous, epitome, monatomic, pentatomic, polyatomic, polytomy, Temnospondyli, tmesis, tome, tomogram, tomography, trichotomous, trichotomy
temn-, tempt-	–	Latin	temnere	contemn, contemnible, contempt, contemptible, contumacious, contumacy, contumelious, contumely
tempor-	time	Latin	tempus, temporis	contemporaneous, contemporary, extemporaneous, tempo, temporal, temporary
ten-, ton- (ΤΑΝ)	stretch	Greek	τείνειν (teínein), τεινόμενον, τανύειν (tanúein), τετανός (tetanós), τόνος (tónos), τονικός (tonikós), τονή (tonḗ), τάσις (tásis), ταινία	anhemitonic, atelectasis, atonic, atritonic, barytone, catatonia, catatoniac, catatonic, decatonic, diatonic, ditone, dodecatonic, dystonia, ectasia, enneatonic, entasia, entasis, epitasis, hemitonia, hemitonic, heptatonic, hexatonic, hyperisotonic, hypertonia, hypertonic, hypotenuse, hypotonia, hypotonic, isotonic, microtone, monotone, monotonic, monotonous, monotony, neoteny, octatonic, oxytone, paroxytone, pentatonic, peritoneum, polytonic, proparoxytone, protasis, pyelectasis, syntonic, tetanolysin, tetanospasmin, tetanus, tetany, tetratonic, tone, tonic, tonoplast, tritonic, tune
ten-, -tin-, tent-, tain-, tinu-	hold, keep	Latin	tenere, tentus	abstain, abstention, abstinence, abstinent, appertain, appertinent, appurtenance, appurtenant, contain, containment, content, contentive, contentment, continence, continent, continental, continual, continuance, continuant, continuation, continuative, continue, continuity, continuous, continuum, contratenor, countenance, detain, detainder, detainee, detainer, detainment, detention, detinue, discontent, discontentment, discontinuance, discontinuation, discontinue, discontinuity, discontinuous, entertain, entertainment, equicontinuity, equicontinuous, impertinence, impertinent, incontinence, incontinent, intenible, intercontinental, irretentive, lieutenant, maintain, maintenance, malcontent, obtain, obtainment, obtention, pertain, pertinacious, pertinacity, pertinence, pertinent, purtenance, reobtain, retain, retainer, retainment, retention, retentive, retinue, se-tenant, sustenance, sustentacular, sustentaculum, sustentation, sustention, tenable, tenace, tenacious, tenacity, tenancy, tenant, tenet, tenor, tenure, tenurial, tenuto, transcontinental
tend-, tens-	stretch, strain	Latin	tendere (past participle tensus)	ambitendency, attempt, attend, attendee, attent, attention, attentive, coextend, coextension, coextensive, contend, contention, contentious, detent, détente, distend, distension, distent, distention, entendre, entente, extend, extensible, extension, extensional, extensionality, extensive, extensivity, extensor, extent, inattention, inattentive, inextensible, intend, intense, intensification, intension, intensional, intensity, intensive, intent, obtend, obtension, ostensible, ostension, ostensive, ostensory, ostent, ostentation, ostentatious, portend, portension, portent, portentous, pretend, pretense, pretension, subtend, subtense, superintend, superintendency, superintendent, tempt, temptation, tend, tendency, tendential, tendentious, tender, tense, tensible, tensile, tensility, tension, tensure, tent, tentacle, tentacular, tentage, tentation, tentative, tentiginous, tentorium
tenu-	slender, thin	Latin	tenuare "make thin", from tenuis "thin"	attenuate, extenuate, tenuous
tep-	be warm	Latin	tepere	subtepid, tepefaction, tepid, tepidarium, tepidity, tepor
ter-, trit-	rub, wear	Latin	terere, tritus	attrition, contrite, contrition, detriment, detrimental, detrital, detrition, detritivore, detritivorous, detritus, retriment, tribulation, trite, triturate, trituration, triture
tere-	guard	Greek	τηρεῖν (tēreîn), τήρησις (tḗrēsis)	synteresis
teret-	rounded	Latin	teres, teretis	subterete, teretial
terg-, ters-	wipe	Latin	tergere, tersus	absterge, abstergent, abstersion, abstersive, deterge, detergency, detergent, terse
termin-	boundary, limit, end	Latin	terminus	determine, interminable, terminal, termination
tern-	three each	Latin	terni	ternary, ternion
terr-	earth	Latin	terra	inter, subterranean, terrace, terracotta, terrain, terrarium, terrestrial, territory
terti-	third	Latin	tertius	tertian, tertiary
test-	witness	Latin	testis	attest, contest, detest, protest, testament, testify, testimony
tetart-	fourth	Greek	τέταρτος (tétartos)	tetartanopsia, tetartohedric
tetr-	four	Greek	τέτϝαρες, τέσσαρες, τεσσάρων (téssares, tessárōn)	diatessaron, tetragon, tetrahedron, tetralogy, tetrameter, tetraphobia, tetrapod, tetrode
teuch-	make	Greek	τεύχειν (teúkhein), τυγχάνω, τευκτός, τευκτικός, τεῦξις (teûxis), τεῦγμα (teûgma), τεῦχος, τεύχεος (teûkhos, teúkheos), τύχη (túkhē), τυκτός (tuktós)	Heptateuch, octateuch, Pentateuch
tex-, text-	weave	Latin	texere, textus	context, subtle, pretext, text, textile, texture
thalam-	chamber, bed	Greek	θάλαμος (thálamos)	epithalamion, hypothalamus, prothalamion, thalamotomy, thalamus
thalass-	sea	Greek	θάλασσα (thálassa)	Panthalassa, thalassemia, thalassic, thalassophobia
than- (ΘΑΝ)	death	Greek	θνήσκειν, θάνατος (thánatos)	euthanasia, thanatocoenosis, thanatoid, thanatology, thanatophobia, thanatophoric, thanatopsis
thaumat-	miracle	Greek	θαυματ (thaumat)	thaumatology, thaumaturge, thaumaturgy
the-, thus-	god	Greek	θεός (theós)	atheism, atheistic, ditheism, enthusiasm, monotheism, Pantheon, polytheism, Thea, theobromine, theocracy, theodicy, Theodore, theogony, theology, theophobia, Timothy, tritheism
the- (ΘΕ)	put	Greek	τιθέναι (tithénai), θετός (thetós), θετικός (thetikós), θέσις (thésis), θέμα (théma), θήκη (thḗkē)	anathema, anathematic, antithesis, antithetic, apothecium, athematic, Bibliotheca, bodega, boutique, deem, doom, enthesis, enthetic, epenthesis, epenthetic, epitheca, epithet, hypothec, hypothesis, monothematic, nomothetic, oligosynthetic, parenthesis, parenthetic, polysynthetic, prosthesis, prosthetic, prothesis, prothetic, pseudothecium, synthesis, synthetic, theca, thecium, thematic, theme, Themis, thesaurus, thesis, treasure
thea-	view	Greek	θεᾶσθαι (theâsthai), θέατρον (théatron)	amphitheatre, metatheatre, theatre, theatric
thel-	nipple	Greek	θηλή (thēlḗ)	athelia, endothelium, epithelium, mesothelioma, mesothelium, thelium, thelial
theori-	speculation	Greek	θεωρητικός (theōrētikós), θεώρημα (theṓrēma), θεωρία (theōría)	theorem, theoretic, theorist, theorize, theory
ther-	beast, animal	Greek	θήρ, θηρός (thḗr, thērós)	therapsid, therianthropy, theroid, theropod, theropsid
therap-	serve	Greek	θεράπων (therápōn), θεραπεύειν (therapeúein), θεραπευτός, θεραπευτικός (therapeutikós), θεραπεία (therapeía)	therapeutic, therapist, therapy
therm-	heat, warm	Greek	θέρεσθαι (théresthai), θέρμη (thérmē), θερμός (thermós)	thermal, athermancy, diathermancy, ectotherm, endotherm, endothermic, exothermic, geothermic, homeothermy, hyperthermia, hypothermia, isotherm, poikilotherm, thermobaric, thermochromism, thermodynamic, thermolysis, thermometer, thermophilic, thermophobia, thermoplastic, thermoplegia, thermos, thermosphere, thermostat, thermostatic
thig- (ΘΙΓ)	touch	Greek	θιγγάνειν (thingánein), θίξις (thíxis), θίγημα (thígēma)	antithixotropic, thigmonasty, thigmotaxis, thixotropic, thixotropy
thorac-	chest	Greek	θώραξ, θώρακος (thṓrax, thṓrakos)	hemothorax, pneumothorax, thoracic, thorax
thym-	mood	Greek	θυμός (thumós)	cyclothymia, dysthymia, euthymia, hyperthymia
thyr-	door	Greek	θύρα (thúra)	thyratron
thyre-	large shield	Greek	θυρεός (thureós)	Thyreophora, thyroid, thyrotropin, thyroxine
tim-	be afraid	Latin	timere	timid, timorous
ting-, tinct- (TING)	dye, moisten	Latin	tingere, tinctus	aquatint, distain, mezzotint, tinct, tinctorial, tincture, tinge, tingent, tint
tom-	cut	Greek	τομή (tomḗ), τόμος (tómos)	anatomy, appendectomy, atom, dichotomy, ectomy, embolectomy, tome, tonsillectomy, vasectomy
ton- (ΤΑΝ)	stretch	Greek	τείνειν (teínein), τόνος (tónos), τονικός (tonikós)	isotonic, monotone, tone
top-	place, location	Greek	τόπος (tópos)	atopic, atopy, dystopia, ectopia, ectopic, entopic, epitope, eutopia, isotope, nomotopic, polytope, topiary, topic, topography, topology, toponomastics, toponym, toponymy, topos, utopia, zonotope
torn-	turn, rotate	Latin from Greek	tornare < τόρνος (tórnos)	tornado, tournament, turn
torpe-	be numb	Latin	torpere	torpent, torpid, torpor
torqu-, tort-	twist	Latin	torquere, tortus	contort, distort, extort, extortion, retort, torque, torsion, tortuous, torture
tot-	all, whole	Latin	totus	subtotal, total, totality
tox-	arrow, bow, poison	Greek	τόξον (tóxon)	anatoxin, antitoxin, autotoxin, exotoxin, intoxicate, neurotoxin, psychotoxic, toxic, toxin, toxoid, toxology, toxoplasmosis
trab-	beam	Latin	trabs, trabis	trabeculae
trach-	rough	Greek	τραχύς (trakhús)	trachea, tracheids, tracheitis, tracheophyte, tracheostomy, tracheotomy, trachoma
trag-	he-goat	Greek	τράγος (trágos)	tragedy, tragic, tragus
trah-, tract-	draw, pull	Latin	tractare, frequentative of trahere, tractus	abstract, attract, contract, detract, retract, subtract, subtrahend, tractable, traction, tractor
trans-, tra-, tran-	across	Latin	trans	intransigent, tradition, transact, transcend, transient, transitory, transparent, transport
trapez-	four-legged, table	Greek	τράπεζα (trápeza), τραπέζιον, (trapézion)	trapeze, trapezium, trapezius, trapezohedron, trapezoid
traum-	wound	Greek	τραῦμα, τραῦματος (traûma, traûmatos)	trauma, traumatic, traumatize, traumatophobia
trecent-	three hundred	Latin	trecenti	trecentennial, trecentillion
trech-, troch-	run, wheel	Greek	τρέχειν (trékhein), τρεχόμενον, τρόχος (tróchos), τροχός, τροχοῦ (trochós), τρόχωσις, τροχαῖος (trochaîos), τροχαϊκός (trochaïkós), τροχοειδής	ditrochee, epitrochoid, hypotrochoid, trochaic, trochanter, trochee, trochelminth, trochlea, trochophore, trochoid
tredec-	thirteen	Latin	tredecim	tredecimal
treiskaidek-	thirteen	Greek	τρεισκαίδεκα (treiskaídeka)	triskaidekaphobia, triskaidecagon
trem-	tremble	Latin	tremere	tremor
trema-	hole	Greek	τετραίνω, τρῆμα (trêma)	monotrematous, monotreme, trema, tréma, trematode
trep-, trop-	turn	Greek	τρέπειν (trépein), τρέψις (trépsis), τρόπος, τρόπου (trópos), τροπή, τροπῆς (tropḗ), τροπικός (tropikós)	allotrope, anisotropy, Atropos, ectropion, entropic, entropion, entropy, heliotropism, isentropic, isotrope, isotropic, isotropy, pleiotropic, pleiotropy, polytrope, protrepsis, protreptic, psychotropic, treponeme, treponematosis, treponemiasis, trope, tropic, tropism, tropopause, troposphere, trove
treph-, troph-	feed, grow	Greek	τρέφειν (tréphein), τροφός (trophós), τροφή (trophḗ), θρέμμα	amyotrophic, atrophy, autotroph, auxotrophy, chemolithoautotroph, dystrophy, hemidystrophy, heterotroph, hypertrophy, lithoautotroph, lithotroph, mixotroph, organotroph, phagotrophy, photoheterotroph, phototroph, phototrophic, phototrophy, pogonotrophy, poliodystrophy, prototrophy, trophectoderm, trophic, trophobiosis, trophobiotic, trophoblast, trophoblastic, trophozoite
trepid-	tremble	Latin	trepidare "to tremble, hurry", from trepidus "alarmed, scared"	intrepid, trepid, trepidation
tri-	three	Greek	τρεῖς, τρία (tría), τριάς	atritonic, triad, triadic, Triassic, tricycle, trigon, triode, tripod, trisyllabic, tritonic
tri-	three	Latin	trēs	triangle, triumvirate, trivia
trib-, tript-	rub	Greek	τρίβειν (tríbein), τριπτός, τρῖψις	diatribe, tribochromism, tribology, trypsin, tryptic
tribu-	pay	Latin	tribuere "to pay", from tribus	attribute, contribute,distribute, retribution, tribe, tribulation, tribunal, tribune, tributary, tribute
tricen-	thirty each	Latin	triceni	tricenary
tricesim-, trigesim-	thirtieth	Latin	tricesimus	trigesimal
trich-	hair	Greek	θρίξ, τριχός (trikhós)	peritrichous, trichopathophobia, Trichoptera
trin-	three each	Latin	trini	trinary, trine, trinity
trit-	third	Greek	τρίτος (trítos)	tritagonist, tritanomaly, tritanopia, trite, tritium
tritic-	wheat	Latin	triticum	triticale
troch-	wheel	Greek	τροχός (trokhós)	trochlea
trop-	turn	Greek	τρόπος (tropos)	contrive, heliotropism, isotrope, psychotropic, retrieve, trope, tropic, tropism, troposphere, troubadour, trove
troph-	feed, grow	Greek	τροφή, τροφός (trophós)	dystrophy, pogonotrophy, trophic
truc-	fierce	Latin	trux, trucis	truculence, truculency, truculent
trud-, trus-	thrust	Latin	trudere, trusus	abstrude, abstruse, abstrusion, abstrusity, detrude, detrusion, detrusor, extrude, extrusible, extrusion, extrusive, inobtrusive, intrude, intrusion, intrusive, nonintrusive, obtrude, obtrusion, obtrusive, protrude, protrudent, protrusile, protrusion, protrusive, retrude, retruse, retrusion, retrusive
trunc-	cut off	Latin	truncare "to maim, mutilate", from truncus "mutilated, cut off"	detruncate, detruncation, entrench, entrenchment, intrench, intrenchment, obtruncate, obtruncation, omnitruncation, retrench, retrenchment, tranche, tranchet, trench, trenchancy, trenchant, truncate, truncation, truncheon, trunk, trunnion
tryp-	bore	Greek	τρυπᾶν (trupân), τρύπανον (trúpanon)	trepan, trypanophobia, trypanosome
tum-	be swollen	Latin	tumere	detumescence, detumescent, intumescence, tumefacient, tumefaction, tumesce, tumescence, tumescent, tumid, tumidity, tumor, tumorous, tumular, tumulose, tumulous, tumult, tumultuary, tumultuous, tumulus
turb-	disturb	Latin	turba	disturb, disturbance, nonperturbative, perturb, perturbance, perturbation, perturbative, trouble, troublous, turbid, turbidity, turbinate, turbine, turbulence, turbulent
tuss-	cough	Latin	tussis, tussire	pertussis, tussive
tymb-	mound	Greek	τύμβος (túmbos), τυμβεύω, τύμβευμα	entomb, tomb
tympan-	drum	Greek	τύμπανον (túmpanon)	timbre, timpanist, tympani, tympanum
typ- (ΤΥΠ)	stamp, model	Greek	τύπτειν (túptein), τύπος (túpos), τυπικός (tupikós), τύμπανον (túmpanon)	allotype, archetype, ecotype, ectype, epitype, ergatotype, heterotype, heterotypic, holotype, homeotypic, homotype, homotypic, isosyntype, isotype, lectotype, logotype, monotypic, neotype, paralectotype, paratype, phenotype, prototype, schizotypic, syntype, type, typography, typology
typh-	smoke	Greek	τύφειν (túphein), τῦφος (tûphos), τυφώδης	typhoid, typhous, typhus
tyrann-	terrible, tyrant	Greek	τύραννος (túrannos)	tyrannize, tyrannosaurus, tyranny, tyrant

Lists of Greek and Latin roots in English beginning with other letters:
- A
- B
- C
- D
- E
- F
- G
- H
- I
- J
- K
- L
- M
- N
- O
- P
- Q
- R
- S
- T
- U
- V
- X
- Z

== U ==
Root	Meaning in English	Origin language	Etymology (root origin)	English examples
uber-	fruitful, udder	Latin	ūber, uberare	exuberance, exuberant, exuberate, uberous, uberty
uligin-	in marshes	Latin	uligo, uliginis	uliginous
ul-	gums	Greek	οὖλον (oûlon)	ulorrhea
ul-	woolly	Greek	οὖλος (oûlos)	Ulotrichi
ultim-	farthest	Latin	ultimus	ultimate, ultimatum
ultra-	beyond	Latin	ultra	ultrasonic
umbilic-	navel	Latin	umbilicus	umbilical, umbilicate, umbilication
umbr-	shade, shadow	Latin	umbra	adumbral, adumbrant, adumbrate, adumbration, adumbrative, antumbra, inumbrate, obumbrant, obumbrate, obumbration, penumbra, penumbral, somber, sombrero, subumbellate, umbel, umbellate, umbelliferous, umbelliform, umbellulate, umbellule, umber, umbra, umbraculum, umbrage, umbrageous, umbral, umbrella, umbriferous, umbrose
un-	one	Latin	ūnus, unius	adunation, biunique, coadunate, coadunation, disunite, disunity, malunion, nonuniform, nonuniformity, nonunion, nonunique, nonunity, onion, reunification, reunion, reunite, triune, unanimous, unary, unate, unicorn, unific, unification, uniform, uniformity, unify, union, unique, unite, unity, universal, universe, university
unc-	hook	Latin	uncus	adunc, aduncity, aduncous, unciform, Uncinaria, uncinate, Uncinia
unci-	ounce, twelfth	Latin	uncia	inch, ounce, quincuncial, semiuncial, uncial
und-	wave	Latin	unda	abound, abundance, abundant, inundant, inundate, inundation, redound, redundancy, redundant, superabound, superabundance, superabundant, surround, undine, undulant, undulate, undulation, undulatory, undulatus, undulose
undecim-	eleventh	Latin	undecimus	undecimal
unden-	eleven each	Latin	ūndēni	undenary
ungu-	claw, hoof, nail	Latin	unguis, ungula	ungual, unguiferous, unguiform, ungular, ungulate, unguligrade
ur-	tail	Greek	οὐρά, οὐρᾶς (ourá, ourâs)	anthurium, Anura, brachyurous, colure, cynosure, Diplura, Protura, uroborus, urochord, uroid, uropod
ur-	urine	Greek	οὐρεῖν (oureîn), οὖρον, οὔρου (oûron, oúrou), οὔρησις (oúrēsis), οὐρητήρ (ourētḗr), οὐρήθρα (ourḗthra)	antidiuretic, cystinuria, diuresis, diuretic, dysuria, enuresis, homocystinuria, lithuresis, polyurea, polyuria, strangury, uraemia/uremia, urea, uremic, uresiesthesia, uresis, ureter, ureteroscopy, urethra, urology
uran-	heaven, sky	Greek	οὐρανός, οὐρανοῦ (ouranós, ouranoû), οὐρανόθεν (ouranóthen)	uraninite, uranium, uranography, uranology, uranometry, uranophobia, Uranus
urb-	city	Latin	urbs, urbis	conurbation, exurb, exurban, interurban, inurbane, inurbanity, nonurban, suburb, suburban, suburbanite, urban, urbane, urbanity
urg-	work	Latin	urgere	urgency, urgent, urge, urger
urs-	bear	Latin	ursus	Ursa Major, ursine, Ursus
ut-, us-	use	Latin	uti, usus	abuse, disuse, use, usual, utilitarian, utility
uv-	grape	Latin	uva	uvea, uvula
uxor-	wife	Latin	uxor	uxoricide

Lists of Greek and Latin roots in English beginning with other letters:
- A
- B
- C
- D
- E
- F
- G
- H
- I
- J
- K
- L
- M
- N
- O
- P
- Q
- R
- S
- T
- U
- V
- X
- Z

== V ==
Root	Meaning in English	Origin language	Etymology (root origin)	English examples
vac-	empty	Latin	vacare	evacuate, vacancy, vacant, vacate, vacation, vacuous, vacuum
vacc-	cow	Latin	vacca	vaccary, vaccination, vaccine
vacil-	waver	Latin	vacillare "sway, be untrustworthy"	vacillate, vacillation
vad-, vas-	go	Latin	vadere	evade, pervasive
vag-	wander	Latin	vagus, vagare	vagabond, vague
val-	strength, worth	Latin	valere	ambivalence, avail, equivalent, evaluate, prevail, valence, valiant, valid, valor, value
van-	empty, vain, idle	Latin	vanus "empty", also vanescere "vanish"	evanescent, vain, vanish, vanity
vap-	steam	Latin	vapor	evaporate, evaporation, evaporative, evaporator, evaporite, nonevaporative, vapid, vapidity, vapor, vaporescence, vaporescent, vaporific, vaporous
vas-	vessel	Latin	vas	vascular, vase, vasectomy, vessel
vari-	vary	Latin	variare	bivariate, covariate, covariation, intervarietal, invariable, invariance, invariant, variable, variance, variant, variate, variation, variegate, varietal, variety, variola, variolation, variorum, various, vary
varic-	straddle	Latin	varicare "to straddle", from varus "bowlegged"	prevaricate
veh-, vect-	carry	Latin	vehere "to carry", vectus	invective, inveigh, vector, vehement, vehicle
vel-	veil	Latin	velum	revelation, velate
vell-, vuls-	pull	Latin	vellere, vulsus	convulsion
veloc-	quick	Latin	velox, velocis	velocity
ven-	vein	Latin	vena	intravenous, venosity, venule
ven-	poison	Latin	vena	antivenomous, veneniferous, venom
ven-	hunt	Latin	venari	venison
ven-, vent-	come	Latin	venire	advent, adventure, avenue, circumvent, contravene, convene, convenient, convention, event, intervene, intervention, invent, prevent, revenue, souvenir, supervene, venue, venture
vend-	sell	Latin	vendere	vend, vendor
vener-	respectful	Latin	venus, veneris	venerable, veneration, venereal
vent-	wind	Latin	ventus	ventilation, ventilator
ventr-	belly	Latin	venter, ventris	ventral
ver-	true	Latin	verus	aver, veracious, verdict, verify, verisimilar, verisimilitude, verity, very
verb-	word	Latin	verbum	verbal, verbatim, verbosity
verber-	whip	Latin	verber	reverberation
verm-	worm	Latin	vermis	vermicompost, vermiculite, vermiform, vermin
vern-	spring	Latin	ver, vernus	vernal
vers-, vert-	turn	Latin	versus, past participle of vertere	adverse, adversity, advertise, anniversary, avert, controversy, controvert, conversant, conversation, converse, convert, diversify, divert, extrovert, introvert, inverse, invert, perverse, pervert, reverse, revert, subvert, tergiversate, transverse, universe, versatile, verse, version, versus, vertebra, vertex, vertical, vertigo
vesic-	bladder	Latin	vesica	vesical
vesper-	evening, western	Latin	vespera	vesperal
vest-	clothing, garment	Latin	vestire "to clothe", related to vestis "garment"	divest, invest, investiture, transvestite, travesty, vest, vestibule, vestment
vestig-	track	Latin	vestigium	investigate, vestigial
vet-	forbid	Latin	vetare	veto
veter-	old	Latin	vetus, veteris	inveterate, veteran
vi-	way	Latin	via	deviate, obviate, obvious, via
vic-	change	Latin	vicis	vicar, vicarious, vice versa, vicissitude
vicen-, vigen-	twenty each	Latin	viceni	vicenary
vicesim-, vigesim-	twentieth	Latin	vicesimus	vicesimary, vicesimation, vigesimal
vid-, vis-	see	Latin	videre, visus	advice, advisable, advise, advisement, advisor, advisory, clairvoyance, clairvoyant, counterview, enviable, envious, envisage, envisagement, envision, envy, evidence, evident, evidential, evidentiality, evidentiary, improvidence, improvident, improvisation, improvisational, improvise, imprudence, imprudent, inadvisable, inevident, interview, interviewee, invidious, invisibility, invisible, nonevidentiary, nonsupervisory, nonvisual, preview, previse, provide, providence, provident, provision, provisional, provisionality, proviso, provisory, prudence, prudent, prudential, purvey, purveyance, purveyor, purview, review, reviewal, revisal, revise, revision, revisionary, revisit, supervise, supervision, supervisor, supervisory, survey, surveyor, surview, survise, videlicet, video, view, vis-à-vis, visa, visage, visibility, visible, vision, visionary, visit, visitation, visor, vista, visual, visuality, voilà, voyeur
vigil-	watchful	Latin	vigil, also vigilare	invigilate, reveille, surveillance, vigil, vigilance, vigilant, vigilante
vil-	cheap	Latin	vilis	revile, vile, vilify
vill-	country house	Latin	villa	villa, village, villain
vill-	shaggy hair	Latin	villus	intervillous, velour, velvet, villiform, villose, villosity, villous, villus
vin-	wine	Latin	vinum	vigneron, vignette, vinaceous, vinaigrette, vine, vineal, vinegar, viniculture, vinosity, vinous
vinc-, vict-	conquer	Latin	vincere (past participle victus)	convict, conviction, convince, evict, evince, invincible, province, vanquish, vanquishment, victor, victorious, victory
vind-	to punish, avenge	Latin	vindico	avenge, revanchism, revenge, vendetta, venge, vengeance, vengeful, vindicate, vindictive
viol-	violence	Latin	violens	violation, violence
vir-	man	Latin	vir	decemvir, decemvirate, duumvirate, quadrumvirate, septemvir, septemvirate, triumvir, triumvirate, vigintivirate, virago, virile, virilescence, virility, virilocal, virilocality, virtual, virtuality, virtue, virtuosity, virtuoso, virtuous
vir-	green	Latin	virere	verdure, virid, viridescent, viridian, viridity
vir-	poison, venom	Latin	vīrus	retroviral, retrovirus, rotavirus, togavirus, viral, virality, viricidal, viricide, virucidal, virucide, virulence, virulent, virus
virg-	rod, twig	Latin	virga	virga, virgate, virgula, virgularian, virgulate, virgule
virgin-	maiden	Latin	virgō, virginis	virgin, virginal, virginity, Virgoan
visc-	thick	Latin	viscum	viscosity
viscer-	internal organ	Latin	viscus, visceris	eviscerate, visceral
vit-	life	Latin	vita	vital, vitality, vitamin
vitell-	yolk	Latin	vitellus	vitellogenesis
viti-	fault	Latin	vitium	vice, vitiate, vicious, vituperate
vitr-	glass	Latin	vitrum	vitreous, vitrification, vitriol, virtine
viv-	live	Latin	vivere "to live", related to vita "life"	convivial, revive, survive, viable, victual, vivacious, vivacity, vivid, vivisection
voc-	call, voice	Latin	vocare (to call), from vox "voice" (genitive vocis)	advocacy, advocate, advocation, advocator, advocatory, advoke, advowson, avocation, avouch, avow, avowal, avowry, convocate, convocation, convocator, convoke, disavow, disavowal, equivocal, equivocate, equivocation, evocable, evocation, evocative, evocator, evoke, invocable, invocate, invocation, invocative, invocator, invoke, prevocational, provocate, provocateur, provocation, provocative, provocator, provoke, reavow, reinvoke, revocable, revocation, revoke, vocabulary, vocal, vocation, vocational, vocative, vociferous, voice, vouch, vouchee, voucher, vouchsafe
vol-	fly	Latin	volare	avolation, circumvolant, circumvolation, nonvolatile, volatile, volatility, volitant, volitation
vol-	will	Latin	voluntas "will" from velle "to wish"	benevolence, benevolent, involuntary, malevolence, malevolent, omnibenevolence, velleity, volitient, volition, volitional, volitive, voluntary, Voluntaryism, volunteer, voluptuary, voluptuous
volv-, volut-	roll	Latin	volvere, volutus	advolution, archivolt, circumvolute, circumvolution, circumvolve, coevolution, coevolutionary, coevolve, convolute, convolution, devolve, evolve, involve, revolve, valve, vault, volte, voluble, volume, voluminous, volva, Volvox, volvulus, voussoir, vulva
vom-	discharge	Latin	vomere	vomit, vomition, vomitory, vomitus
vor-, vorac-	swallow	Latin	vorare, vorax	carnivore, carnivorous, devoration, devoré, devour, herbivore, herbivorous, locavore, omnivore, omnivorous, voracious, voracity, voraginous
vov-, vot-	vow	Latin	vovere, votus	devote, devotee, devotion, devotional, devout, devolve, devow, votary, vote, votive, vow
vulg-	crowd	Latin	vulgus	divulge, vulgarity, vulgate
vulner-	wound	Latin	vulnus, vulneris	vulnerable
vulp-	fox	Latin	vulpēs, vulpis	vulpine

Lists of Greek and Latin roots in English beginning with other letters:
- A
- B
- C
- D
- E
- F
- G
- H
- I
- J
- K
- L
- M
- N
- O
- P
- Q
- R
- S
- T
- U
- V
- X
- Z

== X ==
Root	Meaning in English	Origin language	Etymology (root origin)	English examples
xanth-	yellow	Greek	ξανθός (xanthós), ξανθότης (xanthótēs) "yellowness"	axanthism, heteroxanthine, xanthan, xanthelasma, xanthic, xanthine, Xanthippe, xanthium, xanthochromia, xanthochromism, xanthogenic, Xanthoidea, xanthoma, xanthomatosis, xanthophobia, xanthophore, xanthophyll, xanthopsia, xanthopterin, xanthosis, xanthous
xe-	scrape, shave	Greek	ξεῖν/ξέειν (xéein), ξέσις (xésis), ξέσμα (xésma)	arthroxesis
xei-, xi-	ks	Greek	Ξ, ξ, ξεῖ/ξῖ	xi
xen-	foreign	Greek	ξένϝος, ξένος (xénos), ξενικός, ξενία (xenía)	axenic, Xenarthra, xenia, xenic, xenobiotic, xenoblast, xenogamy, xenograft, xenolith, xenology, xenon, xenophobia
xer-	dry	Greek	ξηρός (xērós), ξηρότης (xērótēs)	elixir, xerasia, xerochilia, xeroderma, xerography, xeromorph, xerophagy, xerophile, xerophthalmia, xerophyte, xerosis
xiph-	sword	Greek	ξίφος (xíphos)	xiphisternum, xiphoid, xiphopagus, xiphophyllous
xyl-	wood	Greek	ξύλον (xúlon)	metaxylem, protoxylem, xylem, xylene, xylitol, xylocarp, Xylocarpus, xyloid, xylophagous, xylophobia, xylophone, xylostroma

Lists of Greek and Latin roots in English beginning with other letters:
- A
- B
- C
- D
- E
- F
- G
- H
- I
- J
- K
- L
- M
- N
- O
- P
- Q
- R
- S
- T
- U
- V
- X
- Z

== Z ==
Root	Meaning in English	Origin language	Etymology (root origin)	English examples
zel-	jealousy, zeal	Greek	ζῆλος (zêlos), ζηλωτής, ζηλωτοῦ (zēlōtḗs)	zeal, zealot, zealous
zema-	boil	Greek	ζεῖν (zeîn), ζεστός (zestós), ζέσις, ζέμα, ζέματος (zéma, zématos)	apozema, eczema, eczematous
zephyr-	west wind	Greek	Ζέφυρος (Zéphuros)	zephyr
zet-	Z, z	Greek	Ζ, ζ, ζῆτα (zêta)	zed, zeta
zete-	seek	Greek	ζητεῖν (zēteîn), ζητητός (zētētós), ζητητικός (zētētikós)	zetetic
zizyph-	jujube	Greek	ζίζυφον (zízuphon)	Ziziphus
zo-	animal, living being	Greek	ζῶ, ζῷον (zôion)	anthrozoology, azoic, azotemia, cryptozoology, ectozoon, entozoon, epizoon, Eumetazoa, Mesozoic, Metazoa, protozoa, zoanthropy, zodiac, zoic, zoo, zoochore, zoogamete, zoogeography, zooid/zoöid, zoologic, zoology, zoomorphism, zoon, zoonosis, zoophagy, zoopoetics, zoospore, zootoxin, zooxanthella
zon-	belt, girdle	Greek	ζωννύναι (zōnnúnai), ζώνη (zṓnē), ζωστήρ (zōstḗr), ζῶστρον	phylozone, zonal, zone, zonohedron, zonotope, zoster
zyg- (ΖΥΓ)	yoke	Greek	ζευγνύναι (zeugnúnai), ζεῦγμα (zeûgma), ζυγωτός (zugōtós), ζυγός, ζυγόν (zugón)	azygous, diazeugma, dizygotic, heterozygote, heterozygous, hyperzeuxis, hypozeugma, hypozeuxis, mesozeugma, monozygotic, prozeugma, synezeugmenon, zeugitae, zeugma, zygoma, zygomorphic, zygomorphism, zygomycosis, zygomycota, zygon, Zygoptera, zygote
zym-	ferment	Greek	ζέω, ζύμη (zúmē)	alloenzyme, azyme, azymite, enzyme, lysozyme, microzyme, zymase, zyme, zymogen, zymology, zymolysis, zymosis, zymotic, zymurgy
