= Zoic =

Zoic may refer to:

- Zoic Studios, a visual effects company
- -zoic, a Greek root in English referring to animals
