= Magical creature =

Magical creature, magical beast, or magical animal may refer to:

== Folklore, mythology, and religion ==
- Legendary creature, a type of supernatural entity that is described in folklore
  - Anthropomorphic animal, a non-human entity with human traits, emotions, or intentions
    - Talking animal, a non-human animal that can produce sounds or gestures resembling those of a human language
  - Cryptid, an animal or other being whose present existence is disputed or unsubstantiated by science
  - Monster, a type of fictional creature found in fiction, folklore, mythology, and religion
  - Hybrid beasts in folklore, creatures composed of parts from different animals, including humans, appearing in the folklore of a variety of cultures as legendary creatures
    - Human–animal hybrid, a hypothetical organism that incorporates elements from both humans and non-human animals
  - Shapeshifter, a creature with the ability to physically transform itself through unnatural means
  - Spirit (supernatural entity), an "immaterial being", "supernatural agent", the "soul of a person", an "invisible entity", or the "soul of a seriously suffering person"
- Animals in mythology and religion
  - Animal deity, a non-human animal deity
  - Animal spirit, the spirit of a non-human animal
  - Familiar, a supernatural entity, interdimensional being, or spiritual guardian that protects or assists witches and cunning folk in their practice of magic, divination, and spiritual insight
  - Power animal, a neoshamanic tutelary spirit
  - Totem, a spirit being, sacred object, or symbol that serves as an emblem of a group of people
  - Vahana, a mount of a Hindu deity
  - Zoomorph, an entity with non-human animal characteristics

== Fiction ==
- Book of Imaginary Beings, a 1957 book by Jorge Luis Borges and Margarita Guerrero
- A Book of Magical Beasts, a 1970 book by Ruth Manning-Sanders
- Magical creatures in The Chronicles of Narnia
- Magical creatures in Harry Potter
- Talking animals in fiction

== See also ==
- Therianthropy (disambiguation)
