= Vest (surname) =

Vest is a surname. Notable people with the surname include:

- Alan Vest (1939–2025), New Zealand football player and manager
- Allison Vest (born 1995), Canadian rock climber
- Charles M. Vest (1941–2013), American engineer, educator, and university president
- David Vest (born 1943), American musician
- Dick Vest (1897–1974), Australian rugby league footballer
- Dorothy Vest (1919–2013), American tennis player
- George Graham Vest (1830–1904), American politician
- George S. Vest (1918–2021), American diplomat
- Jesse Vest (born 1977), American musician
- Lorenz Chrysanth von Vest (1776–1840), Austrian physician and botanist
- Will Vest (born 1995), American baseball player

== See also ==
- Paulette Veste (born 1928), French former shot putter and discus thrower
- Vest (disambiguation)
