= List of Greek and Latin roots in English/X =

Lists of Greek and Latin roots in English beginning with other letters:
- A
- B
- C
- D
- E
- F
- G
- H
- I
- J
- K
- L
- M
- N
- O
- P
- Q
- R
- S
- T
- U
- V
- X
- Z

== X ==
Root	Meaning in English	Origin language	Etymology (root origin)	English examples
xanth-	yellow	Greek	ξανθός (xanthós), ξανθότης (xanthótēs) "yellowness"	axanthism, heteroxanthine, xanthan, xanthelasma, xanthic, xanthine, Xanthippe, xanthium, xanthochromia, xanthochromism, xanthogenic, Xanthoidea, xanthoma, xanthomatosis, xanthophobia, xanthophore, xanthophyll, xanthopsia, xanthopterin, xanthosis, xanthous
xe-	scrape, shave	Greek	ξεῖν/ξέειν (xéein), ξέσις (xésis), ξέσμα (xésma)	arthroxesis
xei-, xi-	ks	Greek	Ξ, ξ, ξεῖ/ξῖ	xi
xen-	foreign	Greek	ξένϝος, ξένος (xénos), ξενικός, ξενία (xenía)	axenic, Xenarthra, xenia, xenic, xenobiotic, xenoblast, xenogamy, xenograft, xenolith, xenology, xenon, xenophobia
xer-	dry	Greek	ξηρός (xērós), ξηρότης (xērótēs)	elixir, xerasia, xerochilia, xeroderma, xerography, xeromorph, xerophagy, xerophile, xerophthalmia, xerophyte, xerosis
xiph-	sword	Greek	ξίφος (xíphos)	xiphisternum, xiphoid, xiphopagus, xiphophyllous
xyl-	wood	Greek	ξύλον (xúlon)	metaxylem, protoxylem, xylem, xylene, xylitol, xylocarp, Xylocarpus, xyloid, xylophagous, xylophobia, xylophone, xylostroma
