= List of Greek and Latin roots in English/Q =

Lists of Greek and Latin roots in English beginning with other letters:
- A
- B
- C
- D
- E
- F
- G
- H
- I
- J
- K
- L
- M
- N
- O
- P
- Q
- R
- S
- T
- U
- V
- X
- Z

== Q ==
Root	Meaning in English	Origin language	Etymology (root origin)	English examples
quadr-	four	Latin	quattuor	quadrangle, quadrennial, quadriceps, quadracycle quadrifarious, quadrifid, quadrifolium, quadrifrons, quadrilateral, quadrilingual, quadriliteral, quadrillion, quadrimester, quadrinational, quadrinodal, quadrinomial, quadrinominal, quadripara, quadrireme, quadrisection, quadrivalent, quadrivium, quadruped, quadruple, quadruplet, quadruplex, quadruplicate, quatrain, quatre, quatrefoil
quadragen-	forty each	Latin	quadrageni	quadragenarian, quadragenary
quadragesim-	fortieth	Latin	quadragesimus	Quadragesima, quadragesimal
qual, quant	of how much	Latin	quantus qualis	quality, qualify, quantity, quantum
quart-	fourth	Latin	quartus	inquartation, interquartile, quadroon, quart, quartal, quartan, quartary, quarte, quarter, quartermaster, quartet, quartic, quartile, quartine, quarto, semiquartile
quasi-	as if, almost	Latin	quasi	quasar, quasiparticle
quatern-	four each	Latin	quaternī	biquaternion, quatern, quaternary, quaternate, quaternion, quaternity, quire
quati-, -cuti-, quass-, -cuss-	shake	Latin	quatere	cassate, cassation, concussion, concussive, conquassate, decussation, discuss, discussion, discussive, discutient, excuss, excussio, excussion, fracas, percuss, percussion, percussive, percussor, quash, quassation, recussion, repercussion, rescue, squash, squassation, subconcussive, succuss, succussation, succussion, succussive
quer-, -quir-, quesit-, -quisit-	search, seek	Latin	quaerere, quaesītus	acquest, acquire, acquiree, acquirement, acquisite, acquisition, acquisitive, acquisitory, conquer, conquest, corequisite, disquisition, exquire, exquisite, inquest, inquire, inquiry, inquisition, inquisitive, inquisitor, inquisitorial, inquisitory, perquisite, perquisition, prerequisite, quaere, quaestor, query, quest, question, questionable, questionary, questionnaire, questor, reconquer, reconquest, request, require, requirement, requisite, requisition, requisitive, requisitor, requisitory
qui-	rest	Latin	quies, quiētus	acquiesce, acquiescence, acquiescent, acquit, acquittal, acquittance, inquietude, quiescence, quiescent, quiet, quietude, quietus, quit, requiem, requiescat
quin-	five each	Latin	quini	biquinary, quinarius, quinary, quinate
quindecim-	fifteenth	Latin	quindecimus	quindecimal
quinden-	fifteen each	Latin	quindeni	quindenary
quinque-	five	Latin	quinque	cinquain, cinque, quinquefoil, quinquennial, quinquennium, quinquepartite, quinquevalent
quint-	fifth	Latin	quintus	biquintile, quint, quinta, quintal, quintan, quintant, quintary, quinte, quintessence, quintessential, quintic, quintile, quintipara, quintus, semiquintile
quot-	how many, how great	Latin	quotiens	aliquot, quota, quote, quoth, quotient, subquotient
