= List of Greek and Latin roots in English/U =

Lists of Greek and Latin roots in English beginning with other letters:
- A
- B
- C
- D
- E
- F
- G
- H
- I
- J
- K
- L
- M
- N
- O
- P
- Q
- R
- S
- T
- U
- V
- X
- Z

== U ==
Root	Meaning in English	Origin language	Etymology (root origin)	English examples
uber-	fruitful, udder	Latin	ūber, uberare	exuberance, exuberant, exuberate, uberous, uberty
uligin-	in marshes	Latin	uligo, uliginis	uliginous
ul-	gums	Greek	οὖλον (oûlon)	ulorrhea
ul-	woolly	Greek	οὖλος (oûlos)	Ulotrichi
ultim-	farthest	Latin	ultimus	ultimate, ultimatum
ultra-	beyond	Latin	ultra	ultrasonic
umbilic-	navel	Latin	umbilicus	umbilical, umbilicate, umbilication
umbr-	shade, shadow	Latin	umbra	adumbral, adumbrant, adumbrate, adumbration, adumbrative, antumbra, inumbrate, obumbrant, obumbrate, obumbration, penumbra, penumbral, somber, sombrero, subumbellate, umbel, umbellate, umbelliferous, umbelliform, umbellulate, umbellule, umber, umbra, umbraculum, umbrage, umbrageous, umbral, umbrella, umbriferous, umbrose
un-	one	Latin	ūnus, unius	adunation, biunique, coadunate, coadunation, disunite, disunity, malunion, nonuniform, nonuniformity, nonunion, nonunique, nonunity, onion, reunification, reunion, reunite, triune, unanimous, unary, unate, unicorn, unific, unification, uniform, uniformity, unify, union, unique, unite, unity, universal, universe, university
unc-	hook	Latin	uncus	adunc, aduncity, aduncous, unciform, Uncinaria, uncinate, Uncinia
unci-	ounce, twelfth	Latin	uncia	inch, ounce, quincuncial, semiuncial, uncial
und-	wave	Latin	unda	abound, abundance, abundant, inundant, inundate, inundation, redound, redundancy, redundant, superabound, superabundance, superabundant, surround, undine, undulant, undulate, undulation, undulatory, undulatus, undulose
undecim-	eleventh	Latin	undecimus	undecimal
unden-	eleven each	Latin	ūndēni	undenary
ungu-	claw, hoof, nail	Latin	unguis, ungula	ungual, unguiferous, unguiform, ungular, ungulate, unguligrade
ur-	tail	Greek	οὐρά, οὐρᾶς (ourá, ourâs)	anthurium, Anura, brachyurous, colure, cynosure, Diplura, Protura, uroborus, urochord, uroid, uropod
ur-	urine	Greek	οὐρεῖν (oureîn), οὖρον, οὔρου (oûron, oúrou), οὔρησις (oúrēsis), οὐρητήρ (ourētḗr), οὐρήθρα (ourḗthra)	antidiuretic, cystinuria, diuresis, diuretic, dysuria, enuresis, homocystinuria, lithuresis, polyurea, polyuria, strangury, uraemia/uremia, urea, uremic, uresiesthesia, uresis, ureter, ureteroscopy, urethra, urology
uran-	heaven, sky	Greek	οὐρανός, οὐρανοῦ (ouranós, ouranoû), οὐρανόθεν (ouranóthen)	uraninite, uranium, uranography, uranology, uranometry, uranophobia, Uranus
urb-	city	Latin	urbs, urbis	conurbation, exurb, exurban, interurban, inurbane, inurbanity, nonurban, suburb, suburban, suburbanite, urban, urbane, urbanity
urg-	work	Latin	urgere	urgency, urgent, urge, urger
urs-	bear	Latin	ursus	Ursa Major, ursine, Ursus
ut-, us-	use	Latin	uti, usus	abuse, disuse, use, usual, utilitarian, utility
uv-	grape	Latin	uva	uvea, uvula
uxor-	wife	Latin	uxor	uxoricide
