= Trimetasphere =

Trimetasphere carbon nanomaterials (TMS), also known as trimetallic nitride endohedral metallofullerenes, are a family of endohedral metallofullerenes (EMF). The first TMS adduct, a Diels–Alder cycloadduct of Sc_{3}N by C_{80}, was reported by Dorn et al. in 2002. It was not until 2005 that other derivatives were reported. The most abundant TMS consist of 80 carbon atoms encompassing and forming a complex with three metal atoms and a nitrogen atom (trimetallic nitride clusters, M_{3}N).

== Examples ==
Examples of metals forming trimetallic nitride clusters include:

- Scandium, Sc_{3}N
- Yttrium, Y_{3}N
- Erbium, Er_{3}N
- Lutetium, Lu_{3}N
- Gadolinium, Gd_{3}N

== See also ==
- Endohedral hydrogen fullerene
