= Pyelectasis =

Dilation of the renal pelvis in fetuses

Pyelectasis is a dilation of the renal pelvis. It is a relatively common ultrasound finding in fetuses and is three times more common in male fetuses. In most cases pyelectasis resolves normally, having no ill effects on the baby. The significance of pyelectasis in fetuses is not clear. It was thought to be a marker for obstruction, but in most cases it resolves spontaneously. In some studies it has been shown to appear and disappear several times throughout the course of pregnancy. There is some discussion about what degree of pyelectasis is considered severe enough to warrant further investigation and most authorities use 6mm as the cut-off point.

Pyelectasis is considered to be a "soft marker” for Down syndrome. This, along with other factors such as age and abnormal maternal serum screening (exa, Integrated or Quad screen), may be grounds for a prenatal diagnostic test such as an amniocentesis to rule out Down syndrome.

Babies with unresolved pyelectasis may experience urological problems requiring surgery.

== Etymology and pronunciation ==
The word pyelectasis (/paɪəˈlɛktəsɪs/) is derived from the prefix pyelo-, meaning "[renal] pelvis", and ectasis, meaning "dilation or distension".
