= List of Greek and Latin roots in English/J =

All Latin roots beginning with J

Lists of Greek and Latin roots in English beginning with other letters:
- A
- B
- C
- D
- E
- F
- G
- H
- I
- J
- K
- L
- M
- N
- O
- P
- Q
- R
- S
- T
- U
- V
- X
- Z

== J ==
Root	Meaning in English	Origin language	Etymology (root origin)	English examples
jac-	lie	Latin	jaceo "to be thrown"	adjacency, adjacent, circumjacency, circumjacent, ease, easy, interjacent, interjoist, joist, nonadjacent, subjacent, superjacent
jac-, -ject-	cast, throw	Latin	jacio (also spelled iacio), iectus (jectus)	abject, adjectival, adjective, conjectural, conjecture, deject, dejection, disject, disjection, ejaculate, ejaculation, ejaculatory, eject, ejecta, ejection, ejective, ejectment, ejector, inject, injection, injective, injector, interject, interjection, interjectional, interjector, interjectory, introject, introjection, introjective, jactation, jactitation, jaculate, jaculation, jaculator, jaculatory, jaculiferous, jet, jetsam, jettison, nonobjective, object, objectification, objection, objectionable, objective, objectivity, objector, parget, project, projectile, projection, projective, projector, reject, rejectamenta, rejection, subject, subjection, subjective, subjectivity, subjicible, surjection, surjective, traject, trajectile, trajection, trajectory, trijet
janu-	door	Latin	janua	janitor, January, janus words, Janus
joc-	jest	Latin	jocus (also spelled iocus)	jewel, jewelry, jocose, jocosity, jocular, jocularity, joke, jongleur, juggle, injucundity, jocund, jocundity
journ-	pertaining to the day, daily	Latin	diurnus (also spelled journe)	adjourn, journal, journalist, journey, journeyman, sojourn
jub-	joyful, happy	Greek and Latin	ώβηλος ("iōbēlaîos"), iobeleus	jubilance, jubilant, jubilation, jubate, jubilee
judic-	judge	Latin	iudex, iūdicis	adjudicate, adjudication, adjudicative, adjudicator, adjudicatory, extrajudicial, injudicious, judge, judgement, judgment, judgmental, judicable, judicative, judicator, judicatory, judicature, judicial, judiciary, judicious, nonjudgmental, nonjudicial, prejudge, prejudgment, prejudice, prejudicial, quasijudicial
jug-	yoke	Latin	jugo, jugum	conjugal, subjugate
jung-, junct-	join	Latin	iungo, junctus	adjoin, adjoint, adjunct, adjunction, adjunctive, conjoin, conjoint, conjunct, conjunction, conjunctive, disjoin, disjoint, disjunct, disjunction, disjunctive, enjoin, enjoinder, enjoinment, injunction, injunctive, join, junction, juncture, junta, junto, nondisjunction, nonjoinder, rejoin, rejoinder, sejoin, sejungible, subjoin, subjoinder, subjunctive, surrejoinder
junior-	younger	Latin	junior	junior, juniority
jus-, jur-	law, justice	Latin	ius, iuris	abjure, jurisprudence, jury, just, justice, objurgate, perjury
juv-, jut-	help	Latin	juvo, jutus	adjument, adjutant, adjutor, adjutory, adjutrix, coadjutant, coadjutor
juven-	young, youth	Latin	juvenis	juvenile, rejuvenate
juxta-	beside, near	Latin	juxta	juxtaposition
