= List of Greek and Latin roots in English/I =

All Latin and Greek roots beginning with I

Lists of Greek and Latin roots in English beginning with other letters:
- A
- B
- C
- D
- E
- F
- G
- H
- I
- J
- K
- L
- M
- N
- O
- P
- Q
- R
- S
- T
- U
- V
- X
- Z

== I ==
Root	Meaning in English	Origin language	Etymology (root origin)	English examples
i-	go	Greek	ἰέναι (iénai), ἴμμεναι, ἰόν, ἰών (ímmenai, ión, iṓn)	anion, anionic, cation, cationic, ion, ionic, ionize, polyanion, polycation
iatr-	heal	Greek	ἰᾶσθαι (iâsthai), ἰατρός (iatrós), ἰατρικός (iatrikós), ἰατρεύειν (iatreúein), ἰατρεία (iatreía), ἴασις, ἴαμα	iatrogenic, physiatry, podiatrist, podiatry, psychiatrist, psychiatry
ichthy-	fish	Greek	ἰχθύς, ἰχθύος (ikhthús, ikhthúos)	ichthyology, Ichthyophaga, ichthyophobia, ichthyoplankton, ichthyosis; (spelt icthy-) Icthyophaga
icos-	twenty	Greek	ϝεικοσι, εἴκοσι (eíkosi), εἰκοσάς, εἰκοσάκις "twenty times"	hemi-icosahedron, icosagon, icosahedron
icter-	jaundice	Greek	ἴκτερος (íkteros), ἰκτερικός (ikterikós), ἰκτεριάω	icteric, icterogenic, icterohemorrhagic, icterohepatitis, icteroid, icterus
id- (ϜΙΔ)	shape, form, picture	Greek	εἶδειν (eîdein), εἶδος (eîdos)	eidetic, eidolon, eidos, idol, idolater, idolatry, idyll, idyllic, idyllist, pareidolia
ide-	idea, thought	Greek	ἰδεῖν (ideîn), ἰδέα (idéa)	ideogram, ideologue, ideology
idi-	own, peculiarity	Greek	ϝίδιος, ἴδιος (ídios), "private, personal, one's own"	idiolect, idiom, idiopathic, idiopathy, idiophone, idiosyncrasy, idiosyncratic, idiot, idiotic
ign-	fire	Latin	ignis	igneous, ignite, ignition
ignorare-	not to know, to be unacquainted; mistake, misunderstand	Latin	ignotus	ignore, ignorant, ignorance
imagin-	copy	Latin	imāgō, imāginis	image, imagine
imbr-	heavy rain	Latin	imber, imbris	ignimbrite, imbrex, imbricate, imbrication, imbriferous
in-	sinew	Greek	ἴς, ἰνός (ís, inós), ἰνίον (iníon)	inion, inotrope, inotropic
in- (1), il-, im-	in, on	Latin	in	illuminate, import, incur, intend, invite
in- (2), il-, im-, ir-	not, un- (negation)	Latin	in-	illicit, impossible, inimical, insane, irrational
inan-	empty, vain	Latin	inanitio "emptiness" and inanitas "worthlessness", from inanire "to empty", from inanis "empty, void, worthless"	inane, inanition, inanity
infra-	below, under	Latin	infra	infrared, infrastructure
insul-	island	Latin	insula	insular, insulation
integr-	whole, complete	Latin	in-, teg-	integrate, integration, integer, integrational, disintegrate, integral, unintegrated
inter-	among, between	Latin	inter (preposition)	intercollegiate, intermission, intersection
intra-	inside, within	Latin	intra	intramural, intravenous
iota-	I, i	Greek	iota	iotacism
irasc-, irat-	be angry	Latin	irasci "grow angry", from ira "anger"	irascible, irate, ire
irid-	rainbow	Latin	iris	iridescent
is-, iso-	equal, same	Greek	ϝίσϝος (wíswos), ἴσος (ísos)	isogloss, isograph, isometric, isomorphic, isosceles, isotonic, isotropic
-itis	inflammation	Greek	-ῖτις	appendicitis, diverticulitis, arthritis, tonsillitis, dermatitis, iritis, carditis, gastritis, colitis, cystitis
ischi-	hip joint	Greek	ἰσχίον (iskhíon), ἰσχιαδικός (iskhiadikós)	ischiadic, ischium, sciatic, sciatica
iter-	again	Latin	iterum, iterare	iteration
itiner-	journey	Latin	iter, itineris	itinerary
