= Volte =

Volte most commonly refers to:

- Volte (dressage)
- Voice over LTE
