= List of Greek and Latin roots in English/K =

All Latin and Greek roots beginning with K

Lists of Greek and Latin roots in English beginning with other letters:
- A
- B
- C
- D
- E
- F
- G
- H
- I
- J
- K
- L
- M
- N
- O
- P
- Q
- R
- S
- T
- U
- V
- X
- Z

== K ==
Root	Meaning in English	Origin language	Etymology (root origin)	English examples
-kary-	nut	Greek	κάρυον (karyon)	Eukaryote, Prokaryote
kastan-	brown	Greek	καφέ (kafé)	Kastanophobia
kilo-	thousand	Greek	χίλιοι (khílioi)	kilobyte, kilogram, kilometer, kiloliter
kine-, cine-	movement, motion	Greek	κινεῖν (kineîn), κίνησις (kínēsis), κίνημα (kínēma)	akinesia, akinesis, akinete, akinetic, cinema, cinematic, diakinesis, dyskinesia, dyskinetic, hyperkinesia, hyperkinesis, hyperkinetic, hypokinesia, hypokinesis, hypokinetic, kinematics, kinescope, kinesiologist, kinesiology, kinesis, kinesthetic, kinetic, kineticism, kinetics, kinetochore, kinetophobia, photokinesis, telekinesis
klept-	steal	Greek	κλέπτειν (kléptein), κλέπτης (kléptēs)	kleptocracy, kleptomania, kleptophobia, kleptoplasty
ktet-	possession, ownership	Greek	κτητικός (ktētikós), κτήτωρ (ktḗtōr)	ktetic, ktetor
kudo-	glory	Greek	κῦδος (kûdos)	kudos
