= Plethora =

Plethora may refer to:

- Plethora (medicine), an ancient medical sign describing an excess of body fluid
- Plethora Project, developer of the video game Block'hood
- Plethora Records, a record label operated by Obese Records
