= Perispomenon =

Word with final-syllable rising tone

In Ancient Greek grammar, a perispomenon (/pɛrəˈspɑːməˌnɑːn/ peh-rə-SPAH-mə-NAHN; Ancient Greek: περισπώμενον perispṓmenon) is a word with a high-low pitch contour on the last syllable, indicated in writing by a tilde diacritic (◌͂) or an inverted breve accent mark (◌̑) in native transcriptions with the Greek alphabet, or by a circumflex accent mark (◌̂) in transcriptions with the Latin alphabet. A properispomenon has the same kind of accent, but on the penultimate syllable.

Examples:

- θεοῦ, theoû, "of a god", is a perispomenon
- πρᾶξις prâxis "business" is a properispomenon

== Etymology ==
Peri-spṓmenon means "pronounced with a circumflex", the neuter of the present passive participle of peri-spáō "pronounce with a circumflex" (also "draw off"). Pro-peri-spṓmenon adds the prefix pró "before". περισπωμένη, perispomeni, is the Greek name for the accent marks (◌͂ or ◌̑) used above Greek letters, also known as ὀξύβαρυς, oxýbarys, "high-low" or "acute-grave", and its original form as a circumflex accent (◌̂) was combining the acute (◌́) and grave (◌̀) pitch accents occurring successively only in bimoraic syllables (with long vowels or diphthongs).

== See also ==
- Greek diacritics
- Circumflex
- Pitch accent
- Ultima (linguistics)
- Tone (linguistics)
