= List of Greek and Latin roots in English/Z =

Lists of Greek and Latin roots in English beginning with other letters:
- A
- B
- C
- D
- E
- F
- G
- H
- I
- J
- K
- L
- M
- N
- O
- P
- Q
- R
- S
- T
- U
- V
- X
- Z

== Z ==
Root	Meaning in English	Origin language	Etymology (root origin)	English examples
zel-	jealousy, zeal	Greek	ζῆλος (zêlos), ζηλωτής, ζηλωτοῦ (zēlōtḗs)	zeal, zealot, zealous
zema-	boil	Greek	ζεῖν (zeîn), ζεστός (zestós), ζέσις, ζέμα, ζέματος (zéma, zématos)	apozema, eczema, eczematous
zephyr-	west wind	Greek	Ζέφυρος (Zéphuros)	zephyr
zet-	Z, z	Greek	Ζ, ζ, ζῆτα (zêta)	zed, zeta
zete-	seek	Greek	ζητεῖν (zēteîn), ζητητός (zētētós), ζητητικός (zētētikós)	zetetic
zizyph-	jujube	Greek	ζίζυφον (zízuphon)	Ziziphus
zo-	animal, living being	Greek	ζῶ, ζῷον (zôion)	anthrozoology, azoic, azotemia, cryptozoology, ectozoon, entozoon, epizoon, Eumetazoa, Mesozoic, Metazoa, protozoa, zoanthropy, zodiac, zoic, zoo, zoochore, zoogamete, zoogeography, zooid/zoöid, zoologic, zoology, zoomorphism, zoon, zoonosis, zoophagy, zoopoetics, zoospore, zootoxin, zooxanthella
zon-	belt, girdle	Greek	ζωννύναι (zōnnúnai), ζώνη (zṓnē), ζωστήρ (zōstḗr), ζῶστρον	phylozone, zonal, zone, zonohedron, zonotope, zoster
zyg- (ΖΥΓ)	yoke	Greek	ζευγνύναι (zeugnúnai), ζεῦγμα (zeûgma), ζυγωτός (zugōtós), ζυγός, ζυγόν (zugón)	azygous, diazeugma, dizygotic, heterozygote, heterozygous, hyperzeuxis, hypozeugma, hypozeuxis, mesozeugma, monozygotic, prozeugma, synezeugmenon, zeugitae, zeugma, zygoma, zygomorphic, zygomorphism, zygomycosis, zygomycota, zygon, Zygoptera, zygote
zym-	ferment	Greek	ζέω, ζύμη (zúmē)	alloenzyme, azyme, azymite, enzyme, lysozyme, microzyme, zymase, zyme, zymogen, zymology, zymolysis, zymosis, zymotic, zymurgy
