= Vest =

Vest may refer to:

== Clothing ==
- Waistcoat, called a vest in North American English
- Undershirt, called a vest in British and South African English

== Places ==
- Vest (development region), Romania
- Vest, Kentucky, an unincorporated community in the United States

== Other uses ==
- Vest (surname), a list of people with the surname Vest or von Vest
- Vest (newspaper), a Macedonian newspaper
- Vest (schooner), a Danish auxiliary schooner in service 1958-1968
- "The Vest", an episode of the TV series Homeland
- VEST (Very efficient substitution transposition), a set of families of hardware-dedicated ciphers
- VAX Environment Software Translator, a binary translator for OpenVMS

== See also ==
- Vesting, a legal concept relating to property
