= Hypozeuxis =

Rhetorical term

Hypozeuxis is a rhetorical term for an expression or sentence where every clause has its own independent subject and predicate. If the same words are repeated in each clause, it is also an example of anaphora.

- "We shall fight on the beaches. We shall fight on the landing grounds. We shall fight in the fields and in the streets. We shall fight in the hills." (Winston Churchill)

The opposite of hypozeuxis is hyperzeuxis, which may also be a form of zeugma or syllepsis.

== See also ==
- Glossary of rhetorical terms
