= Therianthropy =

Therianthropy may refer to:

- Human-animal shapeshifting in mythology, folklore, and fiction
- Identifying as a non-human animal, as experienced by the therian subculture

== See also ==
- Theria, a subclass of mammals referred to as 'therians'
- Clinical lycanthropy, a psychiatric delusion of transforming into an animal
- Human–animal hybrids, beings displaying a mixture of human and animal traits, often appearing in mythology and folklore, such as theriocephalic (animal-headed) gods
