= Quaere =

Latin legal term

Quaere is legal Latin, literally meaning "inquire" or "query". In legal drafting it is usually used to indicate that the person expressing the view that precedes the phrase may not adhere to the hypothesis following it. For example:

"I am of the view that the defendant had constructive knowledge of the acts of the sub-contractor, although quaere whether this would still be true had the sub-contractor not included a summary of those acts in the joint proposal that was issued."

The word quaere has occasionally, as a result of misunderstanding, appeared on maps or in gazetteers. The columnist Miles Kington, writing in The Independent, records that when the map-maker John Speed cited Christopher Saxton's original 1578 map of Wiltshire for his new map in 1611–12, there was a hamlet where he had doubts about the correct name. He therefore wrote on the draft map Quaere. This was mistaken by the engraver of the map as being the name of a hamlet or village. The error persisted for well over two centuries; indeed, the following brief entry appears in a gazetteer published in 1805:

QUÆRE, (Wilts) near Wilton.

This obscure word is also used in the Queen song, "The Fairy Fellers Master-Stroke", from the album Queen II, used simply as a rhyming word for 'fairy' - as in the use of the word quaere in the repeated lines "What a quaere fellow," Roger Taylor stressed that it was not related to Freddie Mercury's sexuality. '
