= Xenogamy =

Type of pollination among plants

Xenogamy (Greek xenos=stranger, gamos=marriage) is the transfer of pollen grains from the anther to the stigma of a different plant. This is the only type of cross pollination which during pollination brings genetically different types of pollen grains to the stigma.

The term xenogamy (along with geitonogamy and autogamy) was first suggested by Kerner in 1876. Cross-pollination involves the transfer of pollen grains from the flower of one plant to the stigma of the flower of another plant.

The main characteristics which facilitate cross-pollination are:

- Herkogamy: Flowers possess some mechanical barrier on their stigmatic surface to avoid self-pollination, e.g. presence of gynostegium and pollinia in Calotropis.
- Dichogamy: Pollen and stigma of the flower mature at different times to avoid self-pollination.
- Self-incompatibility: In same plants, the mature pollen fall on the receptive stigma of the same flower but fail to bring about self-pollination.
- Male sterility: The pollen grains of some plants are not functional. Such plants set seeds only after cross-pollination.
- Dioecism: Cross-pollination always occurs when the plants are unisexual and dioecious, i.e., male and female flowers occur on separate plants, e.g., papaya, some cucurbits, etc.
- Heterostyly: The flowers of some plants have different lengths of stamens and styles so that self-pollination is not possible, e.g., Primula, Linum, etc.
