= List of Greek and Latin roots in English/M =

List of Greek and Latin roots in English starting with the letter M

Lists of Greek and Latin roots in English beginning with other letters:
- A
- B
- C
- D
- E
- F
- G
- H
- I
- J
- K
- L
- M
- N
- O
- P
- Q
- R
- S
- T
- U
- V
- X
- Z

== M ==
Root	Meaning in English	Origin language	Etymology (root origin)	English examples
macer-	lean	Latin	macer	emaciate, macerate, meager
macr-	long	Greek	μακρός (makrós), μακρότης (makrótēs) "length"	macron, macrocosm, macroinstruction
magn-	great, large	Latin	magnus	magnanimity, magnanimous, magnate, magnificent, magnify, magnitude, magnum
magnet-	lodestone	Greek	μάγνης, μάγνητος (mágnēs, mágnētos)	bioelectromagnetism, biomagnetism, diamagnetic, diamagnetism, electromagnet, geomagnetic, magnesium, magnet, magnetic, magnetism, magnetite, magnetize, magnetobiology, magnetologist, magnetometer, magnetosome, manganese, paramagnetic, paramagnetism
maj-	greater	Latin	major, majus	majesty, major, majority, majuscule, mayor, semimajor, supermajority
mal-	bad, wretched	Latin	malus	dismal, grand mal, malady, malaise, malediction, malefaction, malevolent, malfeasance, malfunction, malice, malicious, malignancy, malnourished, malodorous, premalignant
mamm-	breast	Latin	mamma	mammal, mammary, mammography
man-, mant- (ΜΑΝ)	crazy	Greek	μαίνεσθαι (maínesthai), μανία (manía), μανικός (manikós), μάντις	hypermania, hypomania, kleptomania, mania, maniac, manic, megalomania, monomania, pyromania, pyromaniac
man-	flow	Latin	mānāre, mānātus	emanant, emanate, emanation, immanant, immanation
man- (MAN-)	stay	Latin	manēre, mansus	immanence, immanent, impermanence, impermanent, maisonette, manor, manorial, manse, mansion, ménage, menagerie, menial, meiny, messuage, nonpermanence, nonpermanent, permanence, permanent, quasipermanent, remain, remainder, remanence, remanent, remnant, semipermanent
man-, manu-	hand	Latin	manus	adminicle, amanuensis, Bimana, bimanous, bimanual, emancipate, mainour, maintain, manacle, manage, manageable, management, managerial, mandamus, mandate, manège, maneuver, manicure, manifer, manifest, manifestation, manifesto, maniform, maniple, manipulation, manipulative, maniraptoran, maniraptoriform, manner, mansuetude, manual, manuary, manubrial, manubrium, manuduction, manufacture, manumission, manumit, manuport, manure, manus, manuscript, mortmain, Quadrumana, quadrumanous
mand-, -mend-	order, commit	Latin	mandāre, mandātus	command, commandant, commandment, commend, commendable, commendam, commendation, commendatory, counterdemand, countermand, demand, demandant, encomienda, mandamus, mandatary, mandate, mandator, mandatory, recommend, recommendation, remand, remandment
mar-	sea	Latin	mare, maris	maar, mariculture, marina, marinade, marinara, marinate, marination, marine, mariner, maritime, submarine, ultramarine
mas-	male, man	Latin	mās, māris, masculus, masculi	emasculate, emasculation, emasculator, masculate, masculine, masculinity
mater-, matr-	mother	Latin	mater, matris	maternal, maternity, matrimony, matrix, matron
maxim-	greatest	Latin	maximus	maxim, maximal, maximum, submaximal
mechan-	machine or instrument	Greek	μῆχος, μηχανή (mēkhanḗ), μηχανικός (mēkhanikós)	machine, mechane, mechanics, mechanism, mechanize, mechanobiology, mechanophilia, mechanophobia
medi-, -midi-	middle	Latin	medius, mediare	dimidiation, immediate, intermediary, mean, media, median, mediate, mediation, medieval, mediocre, Mediterranean, medium, moiety, multimedia, postmeridian, submediant
meg-, megal-	great, large	Greek	μέγας, μεγάλου (mégas, megálou)	acromegaly, Megacles, megacycle, megalomania, megalopolis, megaphone
mei-	less	Greek	μεῖον (meîon), μείωσις (meíōsis)	ameiosis, ameiotic, meiobenthos, meiosis, meiotic
melan-	black, dark	Greek	μέλας, μέλανος (mélas, mélanos), μελανότης	amelanism, aphaeomelanism, eumelanin, hypermelanic, melancholic, melancholy, Melanesia, melanin, melanism, melanoblastoma, melanocyte, melanoma, melanophobia, melanophore, melanosis, melatonin, neuromelanin, pheomelanin
melior-	better	Latin	meliorare "to improve", from melior "better"	ameliorate, amelioration, meliorism
meliss-	bee	Greek	μέλισσα (mélissa)	melissophobia
mell-	honey	Latin	mel, mellis	melliferous, mellific, mellifluence, mellifluent, mellifluous, melliloquent, mellivorous
memor-	remember	Latin	memor	commemorate, immemorial, memoir, memorabilia, memorable, memorandum, memorial, memory, remembrance
men-	month	Greek	μήν (mḗn)	menopause, menorrhea
mening-	membrane	Greek	μήνιγξ, μῆνιγγος (mēninx, mēningos)	leptomeninges, meninges, meningioma, meningitis, meninx
mend-	defect, fault	Latin	mendax "lying, a liar", from menda "defect, fault"	amend, amendment, emend, mendacious, mendacity
menstru-	monthly	Latin	menstruus	menstrual, menstruation
mensur-	measure	Latin	mensura "measurement", from metiri "to measure"	commensurable, commensurate, dimension, immense, incommensurable, incommensurate, measure
ment-	mind	Latin	mens, mentis	comment, dement, dementia, memento, mental, mentality, mention, reminisce, reminiscence
mer-	part	Greek	μείρεσθαι (meíresthai), μέρος (méros)	antimere, antimeria, biopolymer, decamer, decamerous, dimer, dimeric, dimerism, dimerous, enantiomer, enneamer, heptamer, heterodimer, heterotetramer, hexamer, homodimer, homotetramer, isomer, isomeric, isomerism, mereology, merisis, merism, meristem, meristematic, meristic, meromorphic, metamere, metamerism, Moirai, monomer, monomeric, octamer, oligomer, oligomeric, pentamer, pentamerous, photopolymer, phytomer, polymer, tautomerism, telomer, telomere, tetramer, tetrameric, trimer, trimerize
merc-	reward, wages, hire	Latin	merx (genitive mercis)	amercement, commerce, commercial, market, mercantile, mercenary, mercery, merchandise, merchant, mercy, noncommercial
merge-, mers-	dip, plunge	Latin	mergere	demerge, demersal, demerse, demersion, emerge, emergence, emergency, emergent, emersion, immerge, immergence, immerse, immersible, immersion, immersive, merge, reemerge, reemergence, reimmerse, submerge, submergence, submerse, submersible, submersion
mes-	middle	Greek	μέσος (mésos)	Mesolithic, mesophile, mesophilic, mesoscopic, mesosphere, mesozoic
met-, meta-	above, among, beyond	Greek	μετά (metá)	metabolism, metalogic, metamorphic, metamorphosis, metaphase, metaphor, metaphysics, metastatic, meteor, method
metall-	mine	Greek	μέταλλον (métallon), μεταλλικός (metallikós)	dimetallic, electrometallurgy, hydrometallurgy, metallic, metalloid, metallophobia, metallophone, metallurgist, metallurgy, organometallic, polymetal, polymetallic, pyrometallurgy, tetrametallic, trimetallic
meter-, metr-	measure	Greek	μέτρον (métron)	anemometer, anemometric, antisymmetric, antisymmetry, asymmetric, asymmetry, axonometric, barometer, barometric, bathometer, chronometer, diameter, diametric, dysmetria, graphometer, hexameter, hygrometer, hygrometry, isodiametric, isometric, isoperimetric, meter, metre, metric, metrology, metronome, monosymmetric, parameter, parameterize, parametric, parametrize, pentameter, perimeter, polymeter, symmetric, symmetry, telemeter, telemetric, telemetry, tetrameter, thermometer, trimeter, trimetric
metr-	mother	Greek	μήτηρ, μητρός (mḗtēr, mētrós), μητρικός (mētrikós)	haplometrosis, metrocyte, metropolis, pleometrosis
mic-	grain	Latin	mica	mica, micelle
micr-	small	Greek	μικρός (mikrós), μικρότης	microbe, microcode, microcosm, microeconomics, micrometer, microphone, microscope, microscopic
migr-	wander	Latin	migrare	countermigration, emigrant, emigrate, emigration, émigré, immigrant, immigrate, immigration, migrant, migrate, migration, migrational, migratory, nonmigratory, remigrant, remigrate, remigration, transmigrant, transmigrate, transmigration, transmigratory
milit-	soldier	Latin	mīles, militis	militant, military, militia
mill-	thousand	Latin	mille	mile, millennium, million
millen-	thousand each	Latin	milleni	millenarian, millenary
mim-	repeat	Greek	μιμεῖσθαι (mimeîsthai), μιμητικός (mimētikós), μίμος (mímos)	mime, mimeograph, mimesis, mimetic, mimic, necromimesis, pantomime, phenomime, psychomime, psychomimetic
min-	jut	Latin	minere	eminence, eminent, imminence, imminent, preeminence, preeminent, prominence, prominent, promontory, supereminence, supereminent
min-	less, smaller	Latin	minor, minus	administer, administration, administrative, administrator, administratrix, maladminister, maladministration, minestrone, minister, ministerial, ministerialis, ministerium, ministrant, ministrate, ministration, ministrative, ministry, minor, minority, minstrel, minstrelsy, minus, minuscule, quasiminuscule, semiminor
mina-	lead	Latin	minare, variant of minari	amenable, demeanor, promenade
mina-	threaten	Latin	minari	menace, minatory
minth-	mint	Greek	μίνθα (míntha), μίνθη (mínthē), μινθάριον	Acanthomintha, Mentha, menthol, mint, Minthostachys
mir-	wonder, amazement	Latin	mirus, miror, mirari, miratus sum	admirability, admirable, admiration, admirative, admire, marvel, marvelous, miracle, miraculous, mirage, Miranda, mirative, mirativity, mirror
mis-	hate	Greek	μισεῖν (miseîn), μῖσος (mîsos)	misandrist, misandry, misanthrope, misanthropy, misocainea, misogamist, misogamy, misogynist, misogyny, misoneism, misopaedia, misophonia, misotheism
misc-, mixt-	mix	Latin	miscere, mixtus	admix, admixtion, admixture, commix, commixture, immiscibility, immiscible, immix, immixture, intermix, intermixture, maslin, meddle, mestizo, Métis, miscellanea, miscellaneous, miscellany, miscibility, miscible, mix, mixture, permiscible, permix, permixtion, postmix, premix, promiscuity, promiscuous, remix
miser-	unhappy, wretched	Latin	miser	commiserate, commiseration, immiserate, immiseration, miser, miserable, misericord, misery
mit-, miss- (MIT-)	send	Latin	mittere, missus	admissibility, admissible, admission, admissive, admit, admittatur, admittee, commissar, commissariat, commissary, commission, commissive, commissural, commissure, commit, commitment, committal, committee, compromis, compromise, compromissary, decommission, decommit, decommitment, demise, demiss, demit, dimissory, dimit, dismiss, dismissal, dismissive, emissary, emission, emissitious, emissive, emissivity, emit, emittent, entremet, fideicommissary, fideicommissum, impermissible, inadmissibility, inadmissible, intermission, intermittent, intromissible, intromission, intromissive, intromit, intromittent, manumission, manumit, mess, message, messenger, missile, mission, missionary, missive, mittimus, noncommittal, omissible, omission, omissive, omit, permissible, permission, permissive, permissory, permit, permittee, premise, premiss, premit, pretermission, pretermit, promise, promisee, promissive, promissory, readmission, readmit, recommit, remise, remiss, remissible, remission, remissive, remissory, remit, remittal, remittance, remittee, remittence, remittent, remittitur, resubmit, retransmission, retransmit, subcommittee, submission, submissive, submit, surmise, transmissibility, transmissible, transmission, transmissive, transmit, transmittal
mit-	thread	Greek	μίτος (mítos)	mitochondrion, mitosis, mitospore
mn-		Greek	μνᾶ (mnâ)	mina, mna
mne-	memory	Greek	μνᾶσθαι (mnâsthai), μνήμη (mnḗmē)	amnesia, amnesty, anamnesis, anamnestic, dysmnesia, Mneme, mneme, mnemonic
mod-	measure, change	Latin	modus "measure"	accommodate, accommodation, accommodative, accommodator, bimodal, bimodality, bimodular, bimodule, commode, commodification, commodious, commodity, decommodification, demodulate, demodulation, demodulator, immodest, immodesty, intermodal, intermodulation, modal, modality, mode, model, moderate, moderation, moderato, moderator, modern, modernity, modest, modesty, modicum, modification, modify, modiolus, modular, modularity, modulate, modulation, modulator, module, modulo, modulus, multimodal, multimodality, postmodern, postmodernity, Quasimodo, remodel, remodulate, supermodel, trimodal, trimodality, ultramodern, ultramodernity, unimodal, unimodality, unimodular, unimodularity
mol-	grind	Latin	mola, molere, molitus	demolition, molar
moll-	soft	Latin	mollis	emollience, emollient, moil, mollescence, mollescent, mollient, mollification, mollify, mollitude, mollusc, molluscicide, molluscivore, mollusk
mon-	alone, only	Greek	μόνος (mónos), μονάς, μονάδος (monás, monádos)	monachism, monad, monadic, monarchy, monastery, monastic, monasticism, monatomic, monism, monist, monk, monoid, monolith, monometer, monopod, monopoly, monopsony, monotone
mon-	warn	Latin	monere, monitus	admonish, admonishment, admonition, admonitor, admonitory, monition, monitor, monitory, monument, monumental, premonition, premonitory, resummon, summon
monil-	string of beads	Latin	monile	monilifer, moniliform, Moniliformida
monstra-	show	Latin	monstrāre	counterdemonstration, counterdemonstrator, demonstrable, demonstrant, demonstrate, demonstration, demonstrative, demonstrator, demonstratory, indemonstrable, monster, monstrance, monstration, monstrosity, monstrous, muster, premonstrant, premonstrate, Premonstratensian, premonstration, premonstrator, remonstrance, remonstrant, remonstrate, remonstration, remonstrative
mont-	mountain	Latin	mons, montis	amount, Belmont, cismontane, dismount, insurmountable, intermontane, montage, montan, Montana, montane, montant, monticello, monticule, montiform, montigenous, mount, mountaineer, mountainous, nonremontant, paramount, piedmont, remontancy, remontant, remontoire, remount, submontane, surmount, surmountable, tantamount, tramontana, tramontane, transmontane, ultramontane, Vermont
mor-	foolish, dull	Greek	μωρός (mōrós)	moron, moronic, oxymoron, oxymoronic, sophomore, sophomoric
mor-	pause, delay	Latin	morari "to delay", from mora "a pause, delay"	demur, demure, demurrable, demurrage, demurral, demurrer, mora, moratorium, remora, remorate
mor-	custom, disposition	Latin	mos, moris	immoral, immorality, moral, morale, morality, mores, morigerous, morose, morosity
mord-	bite	Latin	mordere, morsus	mordacious, mordacity, mordancy, mordant, mordent, mordente, mordicancy, mordicant, mordication, mordicative, morsel, morsitation, premorse, remorse
morph-	form, shape	Greek	μορφή (morphḗ)	allomorph, amorphous, anamorph, anamorphic, anamorphism, anamorphosis, anthropomorphism, apomorphy, autapomorphy, automorphism, catamorphism, dimorphic, dimorphism, dysmorphic, dysmorphophobia, ectomorph, ectomorphic, enantiomorph, enantiomorphic, endomorph, endomorphic, epimorphism, geomorphology, hemimorphic, holomorph, holomorphic, holomorphism, homeomorphic, homeomorphism, homomorphic, homomorphism, hylomorphism, hypermorphosis, isomorphic, isomorphism, mesomorph, mesomorphic, metamorphic, metamorphism, metamorphosis, monomorphic, monomorphism, morpheme, Morpheus, morphine, morphology, morphosyntactic, morphosyntax, paramorph, peramorphism, peramorphosis, perimorph, plesiomorphy, polymorphic, polymorphism, pseudomorph, synapomorphy, teleomorph, teleomorphic, theriomorphic, trimorphic, trimorphism, zoomorph, zoomorphism
mort-	death	Latin	mors, mortis	antemortem, immortal, immortality, mortal, mortality, mortician, mortiferous, mortification, mortuary
mov-, mot-, mut-	move, motion	Latin	movere, motus	admove, amotion, amove, bimotor, cocommutator, commotion, commove, commutable, commutation, commutative, commutativity, commutator, commute, countermotion, countermove, countermovement, demote, demotion, emotion, emotional, emotive, emotivity, emove, equimomental, immobile, immutable, immutation, immute, incommutable, locomotion, locomotive, mobile, mobility, molt, moment, momental, momentaneous, momentary, momentous, momentum, motation, motif, motile, motility, motion, motional, motivate, motivation, motivational, motivator, motive, motor, moult, movant, move, movement, movent, mutability, mutable, mutate, mutation, mutineer, mutinous, mutiny, mutual, mutuality, noncommutative, noncommutativity, nonmotile, nonmotility, nonmutual, pari-mutuel, permutable, permutate, permutation, permutational, permute, promote, promotion, promotional, promotive, promotor, promove, remote, remotion, removal, remove, subpermutation, transmove, transmutable, transmutate, transmutation, transmute, transmutual, trimotor
mulg-, muls-	milk	Latin	mulgere	emulsion
multi-	many, much	Latin	multus	multilingual, multiple, multiplex, multiplication, multiplicity, multiply, multitude, multitudinous
mund-	world	Latin	mundus	anima mundi, antemundane, demimondaine, demimonde, extramundane, intramundane, map, mondain, mondaine, mondial, mondo, mundane, mundanity, ultramundane
mur-	wall	Latin	mūrus, muri	antemural, immuration, immure, immurement, intramural, murage, mural
mus-	mouse	Greek/Latin	μῦς, μυός (mûs, muós) / mus, muris	musophobia
musc-	fly	Latin	musca, muscae	Musca, muscarine, Muscicapa, Muscicapidae, Muscidae, musciform, mosquito
mut-	change	Latin	mūtare	immutable, mutation, permutation, transmute
my-	mouse	Greek	μῦς, μυός (mûs, muós), μυών	amyotrophic, electromyogram, electromyograph, electromyography, endomysium, epimysium, murine, musophobia, myoelectric, myomancy, myomorphous, myomorphy, myopathy, myositis, myotome, Nectomys, Oryzomys, perimysium, Sigmodontomys
my-	shut (the eyes)	Greek	μύειν (múein), μύσις (músis), μύστης (mústēs)	miosis, myopia, myopic, myosis, mystery
mycet-	fungus	Greek	μύκης, μύκητος (múkēs, múkētos)	ascomycete, basidiomycete, mycology, Mycoplasma, zygomycete, zygomycosis
mydr-	dilate	Greek	μύδρος, μυδρίασις (mudríasis)	mydriasis
myel-	marrow	Greek	μυελός (muelós)	amyelia, myeloblast, myelocyte, myelogenous, myeloid, myelopoiesis, poliomyelitis
myl-	mill	Greek	μύλη (múlē), μύλος (múlos)	amyloid, amyloidosis, amylolysis, amylopectin, amylophagia, amyloplast, amylose, amylum
myo-	muscle	Greek	μυς (mys)	leiomyoma
myri-	countless, ten thousand	Greek	μυρίος (muríos)	myriad, myriagon, myriagram, myriapod, myriapodology
myrmec-	ant	Greek	μύρμηξ (múrmēx)	myrmecochory, myrmecoid, myrmecology, myrmecophobia, Myrmidons, myrmomancy
mys-	uncleanness	Greek	μύσος (músos)	mysophilia, mysophobia
myth-	story	Greek	μῦθος (mûthos)	mythic, mythology, mythomania, mythopoeia, mythos
myx-	slime	Greek	μύσσομαι, μύξα (múxa)	match, myxedema, myxoedema, Myxini, myxogastrid
myz-	suck	Greek	μυζάω (muzáō), μύζησις (múzēsis)	Myzopoda
