= Striated muscle tissue =

Muscle tissue with repeating functional units called sarcomeres

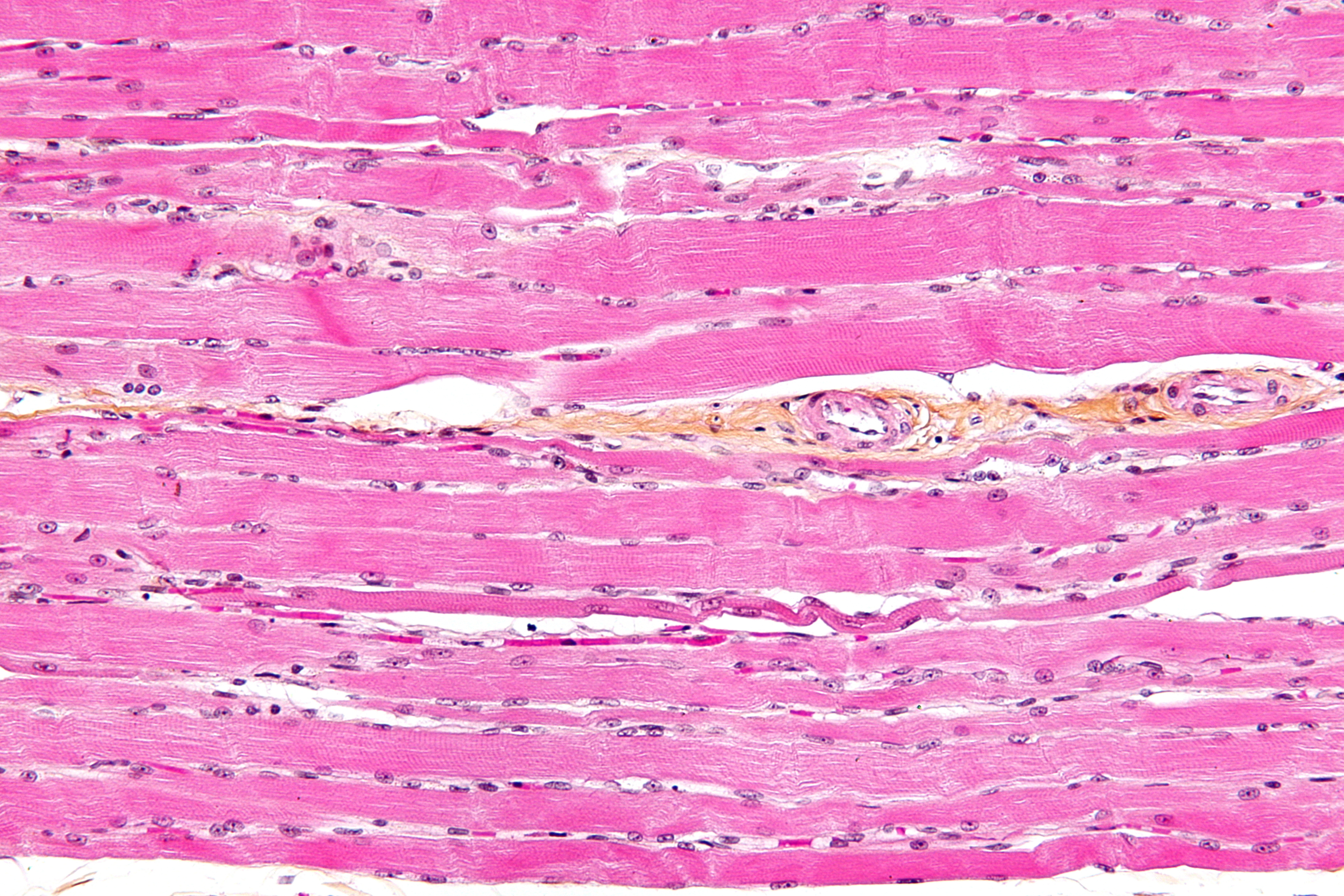
- Micrograph of HPS stained skeletal striated muscle (fibularis longus).

Details
- System: Musculoskeletal system

Identifiers
- Latin: textus muscularis striatus
- MeSH: D054792
- TH: H2.00.05.2.00001
- FMA: 67905

Striated muscle tissue is a muscle tissue that features repeating functional units called sarcomeres. Under the microscope, sarcomeres are visible along muscle fibers, giving a striated appearance to the tissue. The two types of striated muscle are skeletal muscle and cardiac muscle.

== Structure ==
Striated muscle tissue contains T-tubules which enables the release of calcium ions from the sarcoplasmic reticulum.

=== Skeletal muscle ===
Skeletal muscle includes skeletal muscle fibers, blood vessels, nerve fibers, and connective tissue. Skeletal muscle is wrapped in epimysium, allowing structural integrity of the muscle despite contractions. The perimysium organizes the muscle fibers, which are encased in collagen and endomysium, into fascicles. Each muscle fiber contains sarcolemma, sarcoplasm, and sarcoplasmic reticulum. The functional unit of a muscle fiber is called a sarcomere. Each muscle cell contains myofibrils composed of actin and myosin myofilaments repeated as a sarcomere. Many nuclei are present in each muscle cell placed at regular intervals beneath the sarcolemma.

Based on their contractile and metabolic phenotypes, skeletal muscle can be classified as slow-oxidative (Type I) or fast-oxidative (Type II).

=== Cardiac muscle ===
Cardiac muscle lies between the epicardium and the endocardium in the heart. Cardiac muscle cells generally only contain one nucleus, located in the central region. They contain many mitochondria and myoglobin. Unlike skeletal muscle, cardiac muscle cells are unicellular. These cells are connected to each other by intercalated disks, which contain gap junctions and desmosomes.

== Striated versus smooth muscle ==
Unlike skeletal and cardiac muscle tissue, smooth muscle tissue is not striated since there are no sarcomeres present. Skeletal muscles are attached to some component of the skeleton, and smooth muscle is found in hollow structures such as the walls of intestines or blood vessels. The fibres of striated muscle have a cylindrical shape with blunt ends, whereas those in smooth muscle are spindle-like with tapered ends. Striated muscle tissue has more mitochondria than smooth muscle. Both smooth muscle cells and cardiac muscle cells have a single nucleus, and skeletal muscle cells have many nuclei.

== Function ==
The main function of striated muscle tissue is to create force and contract. These contractions in cardiac muscle will pump blood throughout the body. In skeletal muscle the contractions enable breathing, movement, and posture maintenance.

Contractions in cardiac muscle tissue are due to a myogenic response of the heart's pacemaker cells. These cells respond to signals from the autonomic nervous system to either increase or decrease the heart rate. Pacemaker cells have autorhythmicity. The set intervals at which they depolarize to threshold and fire action potentials is what determines the heart rate. Because of the gap junctions, the pacemaker cells transfer the depolarization to other cardiac muscle fibers, in order to contract in unison.

Signals from motor neurons cause skeletal muscle fibers to depolarize and therefore release calcium ions from the sarcoplasmic reticulum. The calcium drives the movement of myosin and actin filaments. The sarcomere then shortens which causes the muscle to contract. In the skeletal muscles connected to tendons that pull on bones, the mysia fuses to the periosteum that coats the bone. Contraction of the muscle will transfer to the mysia, then the tendon and the periosteum before causing the bone to move. The mysia also may bind to an aponeurosis or to fascia.

== Damage repair ==
Adult humans cannot regenerate cardiac muscle tissue after an injury, which can lead to scarring and thus heart failure. Mammals have the ability to complete small amounts of cardiac regeneration during development. Other vertebrates can regenerate cardiac muscle tissue throughout their entire life span.

Skeletal muscle is able to regenerate far better than cardiac muscle due to satellite cells, which are dormant in all healthy skeletal muscle tissue. There are three phases to the regeneration process. These phases include the inflammatory response, the activation, differentiation, and fusion of satellite cells, and the maturation and remodeling of newly formed myofibrils. This process begins with the necrosis of damaged muscle fibers, which in turn induces the inflammatory response. Macrophages induce phagocytosis of the cell debris. They will eventually secrete anti-inflammatory cytokines, which results in the termination of inflammation. These macrophages can also facilitate the proliferation and differentiation of satellite cells. The satellite cells re-enter the cell cycle to multiply. They then leave the cell cycle to self-renew or differentiate as myoblasts.

== Dysfunctions ==
=== Skeletal muscle ===
- Sarcopenia (loss of skeletal muscle mass associated with aging)
- Polymyositis (chronic inflammation)
- Dermatomyositis (chronic inflammation with skin rash)
- Inclusion body myositis (common age-related inflammatory disease)

=== Cardiac muscle ===
- Coronary artery disease (narrowed coronary arteries)
- Arrhythmia (irregular heartbeat)
- Cardiomyopathy (disease of the heart muscle)

== See also ==
- Costamere
