= Isotropy =

Uniformity in all orientations

A sphere is isotropic

In physics and geometry, isotropy (from Ancient Greek ἴσος (ísos) 'equal' and τρόπος (trópos) 'turn, way') is uniformity in all orientations. Precise definitions depend on the subject area. Exceptions, or inequalities, are frequently indicated by the prefix a- or an-, hence anisotropy. Anisotropy is also used to describe situations where properties vary systematically, dependent on direction. Isotropic radiation has the same intensity regardless of the direction of measurement, and an isotropic field exerts the same action regardless of how the test particle is oriented.

== Mathematics ==
Within mathematics, isotropy has a few different meanings:

Isotropic manifolds
A manifold is isotropic if the geometry on the manifold is the same regardless of direction. A similar concept is homogeneity.
Isotropic quadratic form
A quadratic form q is said to be isotropic if there is a non-zero vector v such that q(v) = 0; such a v is an isotropic vector or null vector. In complex geometry, a line through the origin in the direction of an isotropic vector is an isotropic line.
Isotropic coordinates
Isotropic coordinates are coordinates on an isotropic chart for Lorentzian manifolds.
Isotropy group
An isotropy group is the group of isomorphisms from any object to itself in a groupoid. An isotropy representation is a representation of an isotropy group.
Isotropic position
A probability distribution over a vector space is in isotropic position if its covariance matrix is the identity.
Isotropic vector field
The vector field generated by a point source is said to be isotropic if, for any spherical neighborhood centered at the point source, the magnitude of the vector determined by any point on the sphere is invariant under a change in direction. For an example, starlight appears to be isotropic.

== Physics ==
Quantum mechanics or particle physics
When a spinless particle (or even an unpolarized particle with spin) decays, the resulting decay distribution must be isotropic in the rest frame of the decaying particle - regardless of the detailed physics of the decay. This follows from rotational invariance of the Hamiltonian, which in turn is guaranteed for a spherically symmetric potential.

Gases
The kinetic theory of gases also exemplifies isotropy. It is assumed that the molecules move in random directions and as a consequence, there is an equal probability of a molecule moving in any direction. Thus when there are many molecules in the gas, with high probability there will be very similar numbers moving in one direction as any other, demonstrating approximate isotropy.

Fluid dynamics
Fluid flow is isotropic if there is no directional preference (e.g. in fully developed 3D turbulence). An example of anisotropy is in flows with a background density as gravity works in only one direction. The apparent surface separating two differing isotropic fluids would be referred to as an isotrope.

Thermal expansion
A solid is said to be isotropic if the expansion of solid is equal in all directions when thermal energy is provided to the solid.

Electromagnetics
An isotropic medium is one such that the permittivity, ε, and permeability, μ, of the medium are uniform in all directions of the medium, the simplest instance being free space.

Optics
Optical isotropy means having the same optical properties in all directions. The individual reflectance or transmittance of the domains is averaged for micro-heterogeneous samples if the macroscopic reflectance or transmittance is to be calculated. This can be verified simply by investigating, for example, a polycrystalline material under a polarizing microscope having the polarizers crossed: If the crystallites are larger than the resolution limit, they will be visible.

Cosmology
The cosmological principle, which underpins much of modern cosmology (including the Big Bang theory of the evolution of the observable universe), assumes that the universe is both isotropic and homogeneous, meaning that the universe has no preferred location (is the same everywhere) and has no preferred direction. Observations made in 2006 suggest that, on distance-scales much larger than galaxies, galaxy clusters are "Great" features, but small compared to so-called multiverse scenarios.

=== Materials science ===
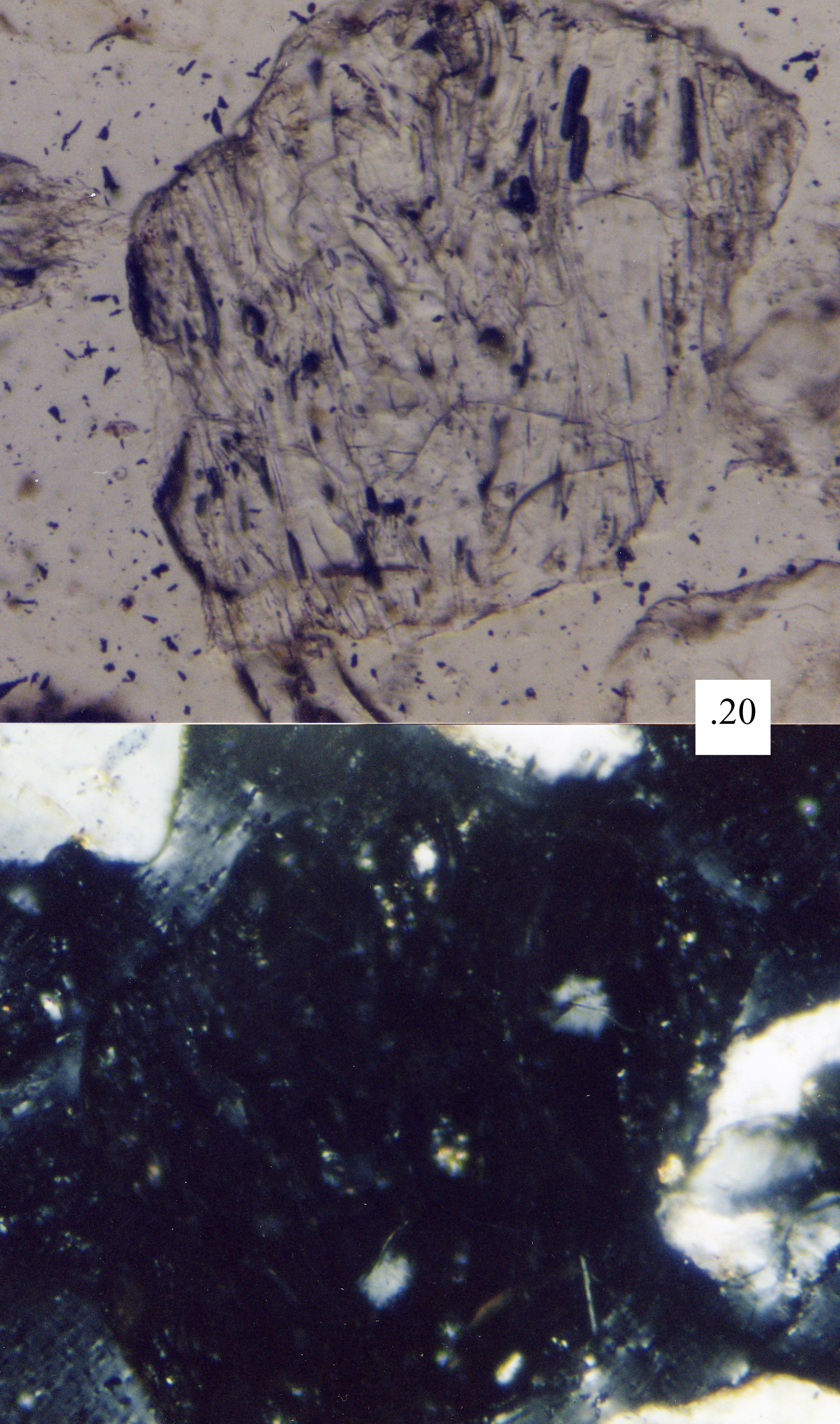
This sand grain made of volcanic glass is isotropic, and thus stays extinct when rotated between polarization filters on a petrographic microscope

In the study of mechanical properties of materials, "isotropic" means having identical values of a property in all directions. This definition is also used in geology and mineralogy. Glass and metals are examples of isotropic materials. Common anisotropic materials include wood (because its material properties are different parallel to and perpendicular to the grain) and layered rocks such as slate.

Isotropic materials are useful since they are easier to shape, and their behavior is easier to predict. Anisotropic materials can be tailored to the forces an object is expected to experience. For example, the fibers in carbon fiber materials and rebars in reinforced concrete are oriented to withstand tension.

=== Microfabrication ===
In industrial processes, such as etching steps, "isotropic" means that the process proceeds at the same rate, regardless of direction. Simple chemical reaction and removal of a substrate by an acid, a solvent or a reactive gas is often very close to isotropic. Conversely, "anisotropic" means that the attack rate of the substrate is higher in a certain direction. Anisotropic etch processes, where vertical etch-rate is high but lateral etch-rate is very small, are essential processes in microfabrication of integrated circuits and MEMS devices.

=== Antenna (radio) ===
An isotropic antenna is an idealized "radiating element" used as a reference; an antenna that broadcasts power equally (calculated by the Poynting vector) in all directions. The gain of an arbitrary antenna is usually reported in decibels relative to an isotropic antenna, and is expressed as dBi or dB(i).

In cells (a.k.a. muscle fibers), the term "isotropic" refers to the light bands (I bands) that contribute to the striated pattern of the cells.

=== Pharmacology ===
While it is well established that the skin provides an ideal site for the administration of local and systemic drugs, it presents a formidable barrier to the permeation of most substances. Recently, isotropic formulations have been used extensively in dermatology for drug delivery.

== Computer science ==
Imaging
A volume such as a computed tomography is said to have isotropic voxel spacing when the space between any two adjacent voxels is the same along each axis x, y, z. E.g., voxel spacing is isotropic if the center of voxel (i, j, k) is 1.38 mm from that of (i+1, j, k), 1.38 mm from that of (i, j+1, k) and 1.38 mm from that of (i, j, k+1) for all indices i, j, k.

== Other sciences ==
Economics and geography
An isotropic region is a region that has the same properties everywhere. Such a region is a construction needed in many types of models.

== See also ==
- Anisotropy
- Rotational invariance
- Isotropic bands
- Isotropic coordinates
- Transverse isotropy
- Bi isotropic
- Symmetry
