= Theodor Wilhelm Engelmann =

German physiologist (1843–1909)

T.W. Engelmann
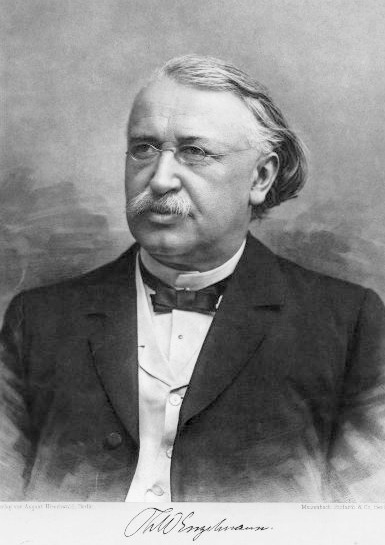
- Born: 14 November 1843; Leipzig
- Died: 20 May 1909 (aged 65); Berlin
- Citizenship: German
- Education: University of Leipzig
- Known for: Discoveries concerning the operation of muscles; discoveries concerning photosynthesis
- Scientific career
- Fields: Physiology
- Workplaces: University of Utrecht, University of Berlin

Theodor Wilhelm Engelmann (14 November 1843 – 20 May 1909) was a German botanist, physiologist, microbiologist, university professor, and musician whose 1882 experiment measured the effects of different colors of light on photosynthetic activity and showed that the conversion of light energy to chemical energy took place in the chloroplast.

== Academic history ==
Engelmann studied natural science and medicine first at the University of Jena, from 1861 to 1862, and later at the University of Heidelberg, the University of Göttingen and the University of Leipzig. In 1867, he received a doctoral degree in medicine at Leipzig.

From 1870 he taught physiology at the University of Utrecht, becoming a professor in 1877. In 1897, he began teaching physiology at the University of Berlin, where he also became the editor of the Archiv für Anatomie und Physiologie. He retired in 1908, but continued to serve as editor until his death.

Engelmann became a foreign member of the Royal Netherlands Academy of Arts and Sciences in 1870 and regular member in 1897.

== Scientific investigations ==
Engelmann's major contribution to the field of physiology emerged from a study lasting from 1873 to 1897, in which he observed the contractions of striated muscles. Focusing on the visible bands of fibers in the muscles, he noted that the volume of the anisotropic band increased during contraction, whereas the volume of the isotropic band decreased. He theorized that it was this interaction between the two bands which allowed for muscle contraction.

He also demonstrated, after experiments with dissected frogs in 1875, that contractions of the heart were caused by the heart muscle itself, not an external nerve stimulus, as was previously believed.

Engelmann performed three significant experiments involving photosynthesis:

In 1881, he observed the movement of bacteria towards the chloroplasts in a strand of Spirogyra algae. Engelmann hypothesized that the bacteria were moving in response to oxygen generated by the photosynthetically active chloroplasts in the algae. This was one of the first documented observations of positive aerotaxis in bacteria. In 1882, he performed his famous action spectrum experiment using a device designed and built by Carl Zeiss. The modified microscope had a prism which could produce a microscopic spectrum on a microscope slide. The device could also distinguish and measure different wavelengths of light making it a “micro-spectroscope.” Engelmann used this device to illuminate a strand of Cladophora (not Spirogyra) with light from the visible spectrum, exposing different sections to different wavelengths (or colors of light). He added the oxygen seeking bacteria B. termo to this setup and noted where they accumulated (Note: Four years later, Hauser concluded that B. termo had been mislabeled and was not one, but three species of bacteria of the genus Proteus). Their clumping allowed him to see which regions had the highest concentration of oxygen. He concluded that the most photosynthetically active regions will have the highest concentrations of bacteria. The bacteria accumulated in the regions of red and violet light, showing that these wavelengths of light generated the most photosynthetic activity. However, his experiment was somewhat flawed because he used the sun as his light source. He failed to account for the fact that the sun does not emit all visible wavelengths of light at the same intensity. However, further analysis of plant pigments proved that his results were valid. A year later Engelmann discovered that purple bacteria utilise ultraviolet light in the same way. Moreover, he was among the first scientists who traced a relationship between the availability of wavelengths in underwater light (which are changing/decreasing with depth) and the occurrence of those phototrophs which can efficiently absorb and use them.

== Musical significance ==
Johannes Brahms dedicated his String Quartet No. 3 to Engelmann, an amateur cellist who had hosted him on a visit to Utrecht.
