= Lateral force transmission in skeletal muscle =

Structure of a skeletal muscle.

A key component in lateral force transmission in skeletal muscle is the extracellular matrix (ECM). Skeletal muscle is a complex biological material that is composed of muscle fibers and an ECM consisting of the epimysium, perimysium, and endomysium. It can be described as a collagen fiber-reinforced composite. The ECM has at least three functions: (1) to provide a framework binding muscle fibers together and ensure their proper alignment, (2) to transmit the forces, either from active muscle contraction or ones passively imposed on it, and (3) providing lubricated surfaces between muscle fibers and bundles enabling the muscle to change shape. The mechanical properties of skeletal muscle depend on both the properties of muscle fibers and the ECM, and the interaction between the two. Contractile forces are transmitted laterally within intramuscular connective tissue to the epimysium and then to the tendon. Due to the nature of skeletal muscle, direct measurements are not possible, but many indirect studies and analyses have shown that the ECM is an important part of force transmission during muscle contraction.

== Mechanical role of the endomysium ==
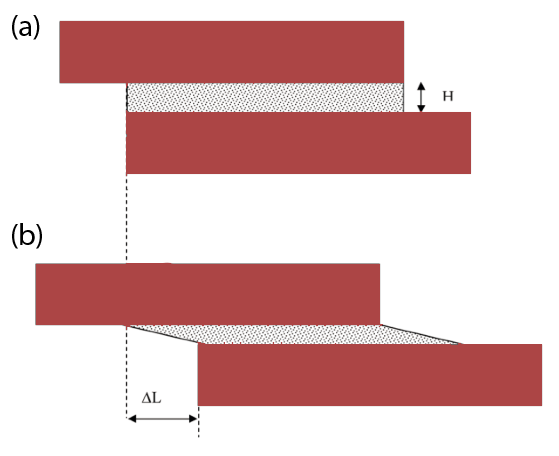
Shear displacements between two adjacent muscle fibers showing the endomysium in its (a) unconstrained state and (b) after shearing.

The muscle fibers within a fascicle are surrounded by the endomysium. The structure of the endomysium is generally equivalent for all skeletal muscle from different muscles and species. Many of the muscle fibers end within the muscle and do not connect to the tendon directly, thus necessitating a force transmission pathway via the endomysium. The planar network of the collagen fibers appears to be randomly distributed at first glance, but detailed analysis has shown that the network is not truly random and that there is a preferred direction that changes with muscle length.

Any linkage transmitting force from the muscle fibers to the tendon must be non-compliant (i.e. high stiffness) in order to be efficient. Experimental force-length measurements showed that the passive tensile properties of relaxed muscle were mainly from the elastic resistance of the myofibrils and not the connective tissue. Also, analysis of the non-linear tensile properties of the endomysium showed that under normal physiological conditions the collagen networks were too compliant in tension to act as efficient force transmitters in tension. Therefore, the concept of shear linkage between adjacent muscle fibers in the endomysium was introduced. The figure to the right is a model consisting of two parallel muscle cells with the endomysium sandwiched between them. Assuming the simplest linear models, the shear stress (F/LW) and the shear strain (ΔL/H) in the endomysium can be related to the shear modulus (G) by the following equation:

$G=\frac{F}{\Delta L}\frac{H}{LW}$

where

- $F$ is the force generated along the direction of the muscle action
- $W$ is the width of the muscle fiber
- $L$ is the length of the muscle fiber
- ${\Delta L}$ is the change in length of the assembly
- $H$ is the thickness of the endomysium

If the change in length (ΔL) is approximated as the longitudinal tensile displacement, the apparent tensile modulus (E_{app}) becomes:

$E_{app}=G\left( \frac{L}{H} \right)^{2}$

The length of the muscle fiber (L) is orders of magnitude larger than the thickness (H), making the term (L/H)^{2} very large. Therefore, the apparent longitudinal modulus is much greater than the true shear modulus. Because the endomysium is so thin, even large shear strains would only result in minute tensile elongations. If the apparent longitudinal modulus is represented in series with the fibers, the modulus of the composite structure (E_{c}) is:

$\frac{1}{E_{c}}=\frac{1}{E_{f}}+\frac{1}{E_{app}}$

and is dictated by the fiber modulus E_{f}, because E_{app} is many orders of magnitude higher. This shear force transmission pathway from one muscle cell to its neighbors is highly efficient and because it has low tensile stiffness, it does not restrict changes in muscle fiber length and diameter during muscle contraction.

== Mechanical role of the perimysium ==
Unlike the endomysium, the perimysium has large variations in quantity and organization from one muscle group to another. Muscles contain far more perimysial than endomysial connective tissue, and it has also been observed that the ratio of the dry mass of perimysium to that of endomysium ranges between 2.8-1 and 64–1. The anatomical arrangement of the connective tissue at each level of organization influences the function of the muscle.

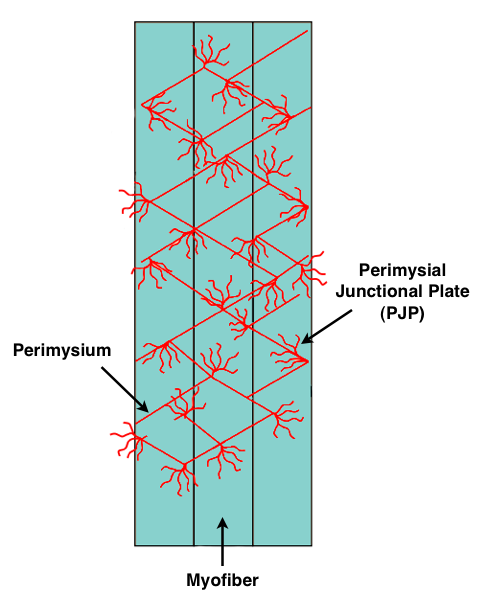
Attachment of the perimysium to the endomysium at the perimysial junctional plates (PJPs).

The collagen fibers in the perimysium usually orient between 45 and 60 degrees to the long axis of the muscle fibers in their relaxed state. Well defined contact regions between the endomysium and perimysium were observed and coined the perimysial junctional plate (PJP). These sites were hypothesized to be a focal region for delivery of tension during muscle contraction. To test the possibility of tensile force transmission via the perimysium, it was experimentally shown that cutting of the aponeurosis in a pennate muscle did not prevent tension generation further along towards the tendon. Also, in a separate study it was clearly demonstrated that the perimysium could transmit force if tendons normally transmitting force from distinct parts of the extensor digitorum longus muscle were cut.

Although a lot of evidence may seem to point to lateral force transmission via the perimysium in tension, the experiments were conducted at very high loads. Under sufficient stress, the collagen fibers of the perimysium begin to orient parallel to the stress direction. The stretching and reorientation of the perimysium makes it much stiffer and able to transmit tensile force. Scanning electron microscope images have shown that the perimysium has an organized crimped structure. The crimped structure of the perimysium makes it very compliant in tension under normal physiological conditions allowing the muscle to change shape, thus rendering it unfeasible for tensile force transmission. Although strong efforts have been made to demonstrate the mechanical role of the perimysium as a force transmission pathway during active contraction of the muscle, an accepted model has yet to be derived.

It can also be suggested that the perimysium could transmit force generated in fascicles to neighboring fascicles by shear, similar to the endomysium described above. The perimysium is significantly thicker than the endomysium. Even if the shear modulus of the perimysium were within an order of magnitude of the endomysium, the perimysium would still be a lot more compliant in shear than the endomysium, also making it an inefficient force transmission pathway.

There are alternate theories on the role of the perimysium being strictly for distributing passive forces imposed on the muscle and that the perimysial network's main purpose is to prevent over-stretching of the muscle fascicles.
