= Isotropic bands =

Lighter bands of skeletal muscle

In physiology, isotropic bands (better known as I bands) are the lighter bands of skeletal muscle cells (a.k.a. muscle fibers). Isotropic bands contain only actin-containing thin filaments. The thin filaments are placed between 2 myosin filaments and contain only the actin filaments of neighboring sarcomeres. Bisecting the I band and serving as an anchoring point for the two adjacent actin filaments is the Z disc. During muscle contraction, the I band will shorten, while the A band will maintain its width.

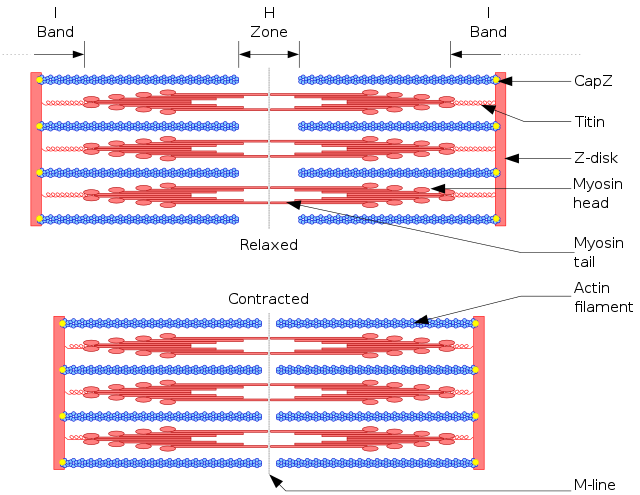
The muscle is made up of several myofibrils packed into functional units surrounded by different layers of connective tissues (epimysium, perimysium, and endomysium). The main contractile unit is mainly composed of protein filaments (myofilaments), namely myosin (thick filaments) and actin (thin filaments).

== Cellular anatomy ==
The darker bands within skeletal muscle, known as anisotropic bands (A bands), encompass both thick and thin filaments and constitute the central region of the sarcomere, extending across the H-zone. Collectively, the A bands and the I bands create the distinctive striped appearance of skeletal muscle tissue. Tropomyosin, a protein, shields the myosin-binding sites, hindering actin from binding to myosin. It attaches to troponin, which secures it in place. During muscle relaxation, the troponin-tropomyosin complex inhibits myosin heads from binding to the active sites on actin microfilaments. Troponin also possesses a calcium ion binding site. These two regulatory proteins cooperate in response to calcium levels, overseeing sarcomere contraction. During muscle contraction, tropomyosin shifts to expose the myosin-binding site on an actin filament, allowing the interaction between actin and myosin microfilaments to occur. The initiation of contraction involves calcium ions binding to troponin, prompting a reaction that displaces tropomyosin from the actin filament binding sites. Consequently, myosin heads can attach to these exposed sites, forming cross-bridges and initiating muscle contraction.
