= Ideophone =

Words evoking specific sensations

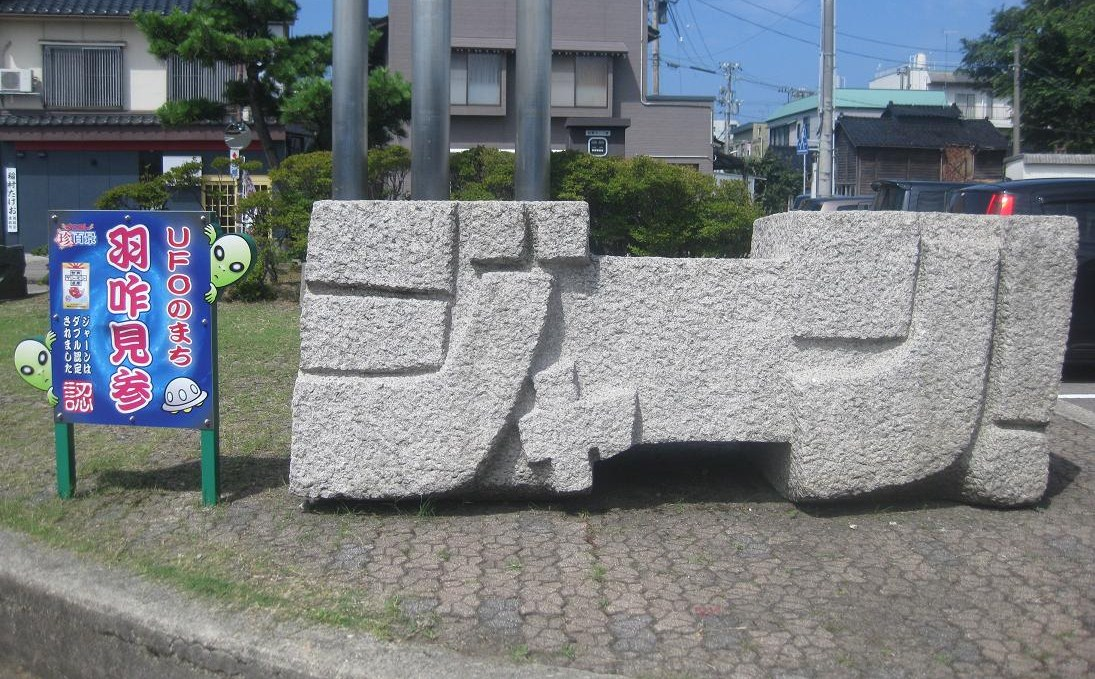
A sculpture demonstrating an example of Japanese sound symbolism, "jaan!" (ジャーン)

An ideophone (also known as a mimetic or expressive) is a member of the class of words that depict sensory imagery or sensations, evoking ideas of action, sound, movement, color, or shape. The class of ideophones is the least common syntactic category cross-linguistically; it occurs mostly in African, Australian, and Amerindian languages, and sporadically elsewhere. Ideophones resemble interjections but are different owing to their special phonetic or derivational characteristics, and based on their syntactic function within the sentence. They may include sounds that deviate from the language's phonological system, imitating—often in a repetitive manner—sounds of movement, animal noises, bodily sounds, noises made by tools or machines, and the like.

While English does have ideophonic or onomatopoetic expressions, it does not contain a proper class of ideophones because any English onomatopoeic word can be included in one of the classical categories. For example, la-di-da functions as an adjective while others, such as zigzag, may function as a verb, adverb or adjective, depending on the clausal context. In the sentence "The rabbit zigzagged across the meadow", the verb zigzag takes the past -ed verb ending. In contrast, the hypothetical example *"The rabbit zigzag zigzag across the meadow" emulates an ideophone but is not idiomatic to English.

Dictionaries of languages like Japanese, Korean, Xhosa, Yoruba, and Zulu list thousands of ideophones. Sometimes ideophones are called phonosemantic to indicate that it is not a grammatical word class in the traditional sense of the word (like verb or noun), but rather a lexical class based on the special relationship between form and meaning exhibited by ideophones. In the discipline of linguistics, ideophones have sometimes been overlooked or treated as a subgroup of interjections.

== Characteristics ==
The word ideophone was coined in 1935 by Clement Martyn Doke, who defined it in his Bantu Linguistic Terminology as follows.

A vivid representation of an idea in sound. A word, often onomatopoeic, which describes a predicate, qualificative or adverb in respect to manner, color, sound, smell, action, state or intensity.

Ideophones evoke sensory events. A well known instance of ideophones are onomatopoeic words—words that imitate the sound (of the event) they refer to. Some ideophones may be derived from onomatopoeic notions. In many languages, however, ideophones do not solely represent sound. For instance, in Gbaya, kpuk 'a rap on the door' may be onomatopoeic, but other ideophones depict motion and visual scenes: loɓoto-loɓoto 'large animals plodding through mud', kiláŋ-kiláŋ 'in a zigzagging motion', pɛɗɛŋ-pɛɗɛŋ 'razor sharp'.

Ideophones are often characterized as iconic or sound-symbolic words, meaning that there can be a resemblance between their form and their meaning. For instance, in West-African languages, voiced consonants and low tone in ideophones are often connected to largeness and heaviness, whereas voiceless consonants and high tones tend to relate to smallness and lightness. Reduplication figures quite prominently in ideophones, often conveying a sense of repetition or plurality present in the evoked event. The iconicity of ideophones is shown by the fact that people can guess the meanings of ideophones from various languages at a level above chance. However, the form of ideophones does not completely relate to their meaning; as conventionalized words, they contain arbitrary, language-specific phonemes just like other parts of the vocabulary.

Ideophones are also frequently accompanied by gesture and expressive intonational patterns (Nuckolls, 2019).

=== Grammar ===
The grammatical function of ideophones varies by language. In some languages (e.g. Welayta, Yir-Yiront, Semai, Korean), they form a separate word class, while in others, they occur across a number of different word classes (e.g. Mundang, Ewe, Sotho, Hausa).

Despite this diversity, ideophones show a number of robust regularities across languages. One is that they are often marked in the same way as quoted speech and demonstrations. Sometimes ideophones can form a complete utterance on their own, as in English "ta-da!" or Japanese jaan (ジャーン; ta-da). However, in such cases the word ideophone is used as a synonym to interjection. Proper ideophones may occur within utterances, depicting a scene described by other elements of the utterance, as in Japanese Taro wa sutasuta to haya-aruki o shita "Taro walked hurriedly' (literally 'Taro did haste-walk sutasuta'). Ideophones are more like illustrations of events than responses to events. An ideophone like Gbaya kiláŋ-kiláŋ 'in a zigzagging motion' displays a certain resemblance to the event (for instance, its irregular vowels and tones depicting the irregularity of the motion).

=== Registers ===
Languages may differ in the context in which ideophones are used. In some languages, ideophones are primarily used in spoken language (e.g. narrative contexts) and are rarely encountered in written language. In other languages (e.g. Ewe, Japanese), ideophones can be freely used in all registers. In general, however, ideophones tend to occur more extensively in spoken language because of their expressive or dramaturgic function.

== Examples ==
=== Japanese ===
The Japanese language has thousands of ideophones, often called mimetics. The constructions are quite metrical 2-2, or 3-3, where morae play a role in the symmetry. The first consonant of the second word of the reduplication may become voiced if phonological conditions allow. Japanese ideophones are used extensively in daily conversations as well as in the written language.

- doki doki (ドキドキ) – heart-pounding
- kira kira (キラキラ) – glittery
- shiin (シーン) – silence
- niko niko (ニコニコ) – smile
- jii (じー) – stare
- run run (ルンルン) – cheerful

=== Tamil ===
The Tamil language uses many ideophones, both in colloquial and formal usage. Ideophones are often, but not always, in the form of irattaik kilavi (இரட்டைக் கிளவி), meaning-free words that are only used in double succession.

- busu busu (புசுபுசு) – soft and bushy
- chattunu (சட்டுனு), also chattu buttunu (சட்டு புட்டுனு) -- instantly, speedily
- choda choda (சொதசொத) – marshy, waterlogged
- chuDa chuDa (சுடச்சுட) – piping hot
- DamAl Dumeel (டமால்டுமீல்) -- bursting sound
- doLa doLa (தொளதொள) - hanging loose (as in loose fitting)
- gaba gaba (கபகப) -- wolfing down food
- gama gama (கமகம) -- fragrant, as in food
- gaNeer (கணீர்) -- deep baritone
- gappu chippu (கப்புசிப்பு) -- silent
- gara gara (கரகர) – crunchy (as in food), gravelly (as in voice)
- giDu giDu (கிடுகிடு) – quickly, fast; also fearful
- gubu gubu (குபுகுபு) -- rapid flow of, e.g., smoke, blood, etc.
- jAm jAm (ஜாம்ஜாம்) -- posh, as in a wedding
- kaDak maDak (கடக்மடக்) -- chewing something hard
- kaNa kaNa (கணகண) -- warm, hot
- kasa kasa (கசகச) -- uncomfortably humid
- kozha kozha (கொழகொழ) – slimy, gooey
- kozhu kozhu (கொழுகொழு) – plump
- kusu kusu (குசுகுசு) -- secretive
- lap Dap (லப்டப்) -- heartbeat
- labo thibo (லபோதிபோ) -- loudly
- lokku lokku (லொக்கு லொக்கு) -- cough
- longu longu (லொங்குலொங்கு) -- exhausted
- mAngu mAngu (மாங்குமாங்கு) – laboriously
- maDa maDa (மடமட) – quickly
- masa masa (மசமச) – sluggish, lethargic
- mozhu mozhu (மொழுமொழு) – smooth (surface)
- noi noi (நொய்நொய்) -- nagging
- paDa paDa (படபட) -- fluttering
- paLa paLa (பளப்பள/பளபள) – glittering, shiny
- paLAr (பளார்) -- slap
- paLich (பளிச்) -- bright
- pattu pattunu (பட்டு பட்டுனு) -- rapidly
- pisupisuppu (பிசுபிசுப்பு) -- viscous greasiness
- saDa saDa (சடசட) -- rain
- sala sala (சலசல) -- water ripples
- sara sara (சரசர) -- snake-like movement
- sora sora (சொறசொற) – rough
- suRu suRu (சுறுசுறு) -- spirited, keen
- Tak Tak (டக்டக்) -- rapidly
- thai thai (தைதை) -- nimble, as in dance
- thaLa thaLa (தளதள) -- lush (as in a lush plant/orchard)
- thillu mullu (தில்லு முல்லு) -- mischief
- thiru thiru (திருதிரு) -- suspicious looks
- thoNa thoNa (தொணதொண) - annoyingly incessant
- thuRu thuRu (துறுதுறு) - brisk, fervent
- vaalu vaalu (வாலு வாலு) -- scolding
- vala vala (வலவல) -- fearful
- vazha vazha (வழவழ) – smooth, slippery
- veDa veDa (வெடவெட) – shaking, trembling
- vinnu vinnu (வின்னுவின்னு) -- pain
- viru viru (விறுவிறு) – energetically (also, spicy)
- visuk visuk (விசுக்விசுக்) -- express, brisk

=== Xhosa ===
In Xhosa, as in closely related Zulu, ideophones can convey very complex experiential impressions or can just strengthen meanings of other words. The ideophone is often introduced using the verb thi 'say'.

Using thi:

- cwaka – to be silent

Lixesha lokuthi cwaka. 'It is time to be silent.' [literally: 'It is time to say cwaka.']

- gqi – to suddenly appear

Bathi gqi abelungu eAfrika. 'The white people suddenly arrived in Africa.' [Literally: 'The white people said gqi in Africa.'])

Without using thi:

- ncam – exact

Andazi ncam.
{I do not know} IDEO
'I do not know exactly.'

- bhuxe – to stand motionless

Ndime bhuxe phambi kwakhe.
{I stood} IDEO before him.
'I stood motionless before him.'

=== Mundari ===
Expressives form a major lexical category in Mundari, even though this language seems to lack fundamental distinction between parts of speech. A Mundari expressive contains two phonologically-mimicking elements in which both have no independent lexical meanings. According to Osada (2008), "the syntax of expressives has never been described. Expressives can occupy any place, that is, in a predicate, complement, or argument slot. As the head of a predicate, expresives can take derivational suffixes, for example, passive, reflexive, benefactive, and aspect markers. Expressives can also form serial verb constructions."

- hayam hayam "to talk in whispers"
- kase kase "to look askance at (a person)"
- mogo mogo "the smell of flowers"
- rada bada onomatopoeia of hail, dry fruit or other hard and dry things falling all about in rapid succession, also of rather numerous drops of water falling all about.
- rigi migi "a cloth variegated with parallel lines or squashes of various colours"
- haʈi kuʈi "to do the opposite action"
- mane gane "want of punctuality in starting dilatoriness"
- rawa dawa "opportunity to do something reprehensible, because there is nobody to interfere"
- roka toka "quickly"
- isiɽi sikiɽi "to laugh coquettishly"

ini-aʔ isiɽisikiɽi ka=ɲ suku-a
that.person-GEN coquettish.laugh NEG=1SG like-IND
'I don't like her coquettish laughing.'

== See also ==
- Ideasthesia
- Sound symbolism (phonosemantics)
- Synesthesia
- Reduplication
- Onomatopoeia
- Japanese sound symbolism
- Bouba/kiki effect

== Bibliography ==
- Childs, G. Tucker (1994). "African Ideophones". In Leanne Hinton; Johanna Nichols; John J. Ohala (eds.). Sound Symbolism. Cambridge: Cambridge University Press. pp. 178–204. ISBN 0-521-45219-8.
- Diffloth, Gérard (1972). "Notes on expressive meaning". Chicago Linguistic Society. 8: 440–447.
- Dingemanse, Mark; Blasi, Damián E.; Lupyan, Gary; Christiansen, Morten H.; Monaghan, Padraic (2015). "Arbitrariness, iconicity and systematicity in language". Trends in Cognitive Sciences. 19 (10): 603–615. doi:10.1016/j.tics.2015.07.013. hdl:11858/00-001M-0000-0028-7AAB-C. PMID 26412098. S2CID 3634642.
- Dingemanse, Mark; Schuerman, Will; Reinisch, Eva; Tufvesson, Sylvia; Mitterer, Holger (2016). "What sound symbolism can and cannot do: testing the iconicity of ideophones from five languages". Language. 92 (2): e117–e133. doi:10.1353/lan.2016.0034. hdl:11858/00-001M-0000-002A-62F0-7. S2CID 148546000.
- Ido, Shinji (2011). "Vowel alternation in disyllabic reduplicatives: An areal dimension". Eesti ja Soome-Ugri Keeleteaduse Ajakiri. 2 (1): 185–193.
- Imai, Mutsumi; Kita, Sotaro (2014-09-19). "The sound symbolism bootstrapping hypothesis for language acquisition and language evolution". Philosophical Transactions of the Royal Society B: Biological Sciences. 369 (1651) 20130298. doi:10.1098/rstb.2013.0298. ISSN 0962-8436. PMC 4123677. PMID 25092666.
- Iwasaki, Noriko; Vinson, David P.; Vigliocco, Gabriella (2007). "What do English Speakers know about gera-gera and yota-yota?: A Cross-linguistic Investigation of Mimetic Words for Laughing and Walking". Japanese Language Education Around the Globe. 17: 53–78.
- Nuckolls, Janis B. (2004). "To be or to be not ideophonically impoverished". In Wai Fong Chiang; Elaine Chun; Laura Mahalingappa; Siri Mehus (eds.). SALSA XI: Proceedings of the Eleventh Annual Symposium about Language and Society. Texas Linguistic Forum. Austin: University of Texas. pp. 131–142.
- Voeltz, F. K. Erhard; Christa Kilian-Hatz, eds. (2001). Ideophones. Typological Studies in Language. Amsterdam: John Benjamins. ISBN 978-90-272-2946-5.
- Westermann, Diedrich Hermann (1927). "Laut, Ton und Sinn in westafrikanischen Sudansprachen". In Boas, Franz (ed.). Festschrift Meinhof. Hamburg: L. Friederichsen. pp. 315–328.
