= Muscle fascicle =

Bundle of skeletal muscle fibers

- Structure of a skeletal muscle. (Fascicle labeled at bottom right.)

Details
- Part of: Skeletal muscle

Identifiers
- Latin: fasiculus muscularis
- TA2: 2006
- TH: H3.03.00.0.00003
- FMA: 76740

A muscle fascicle is a bundle of skeletal muscle fibers surrounded by perimysium, a type of connective tissue.

== Structure ==
Muscle cells are grouped into muscle fascicles by enveloping perimysium connective tissue. Fascicles are bundled together by epimysium connective tissue. Muscle fascicles typically only contain one type of muscle cell (either type I fibres or type II fibres), but can contain a mixture of both types.

== Function ==
In the heart, specialized cardiac muscle cells transmit electrical impulses from the atrioventricular node (AV node) to the Purkinje fibers – fascicles, also referred to as bundle branches. These start as a single fascicle of fibers at the AV node called the bundle of His that then splits into three bundle branches: the right fascicular branch, left anterior fascicular branch, and left posterior fascicular branch.

== Clinical significance ==
Myositis may cause thickening of the muscle fascicles. This may be detected with ultrasound scans.

Muscle fascicle structure is a useful diagnostic tool for dermatomyositis. Myocytes towards the edges of the muscle fascicle are typically narrower, while those at the centre of the muscle fascicle are a normal thickness.

Muscle fascicles may be involved in myokymia, although commonly only individual myocytes are involved.

== See also ==
- Deep fascia
- Endomysium
- Epimysium
