= Phonestheme =

Concept in linguistics

A phonestheme (/foʊ.ˈnɛs.θiːm/, foh-NESS-theem; phonaestheme in British English) is a pattern of sounds systematically paired with a certain meaning in a language. The concept was proposed in 1930 by British linguist J. R. Firth, who coined the term from the Greek φωνή phone, "sound", and αἴσθημα aisthema, "perception" (from αίσθάνομαι aisthanomai, "I perceive"). For example, sequence "sl-" appears in English words denoting low-friction motion, like "slide", "slick" and "sled".

A phonestheme is different from a phoneme (a basic unit of word-differentiating sound) or a morpheme (a basic unit of meaning) because it does not meet the normal criterion of compositionality.

Within C.S. Peirce's "theory of signs" the phonestheme is considered to be an "icon" rather than a "symbol" or an "index".

== Identification ==
Phonesthemes are of critical interest to students of the internal structure of words because they appear to be a case where the internal structure of the word is non-compositional; i.e., a word with a phonestheme in it has other material in it that is not itself a morpheme. Phonesthemes "fascinate some linguists", as Ben Zimmer has phrased it, in a process that can become "mystical" or "unscientific".

For example, the English phonestheme "gl-" occurs in a large number of words relating to light or vision, like "glitter", "glisten", "glow", "gleam", "glare", "glint", "glimmer", "gloss", and so on; yet, despite this, the remainder of each word is not itself a phonestheme (i.e., a pairing of form and meaning); i.e., "-isten", "-ow", and "-eam" do not make meaningful contributions to "glisten", "glow", and "gleam". There are multiple main ways in which phonesthemes are empirically identified.

=== Corpus studies ===
The first is through corpus studies, where the words of a language are subjected to statistical analysis, and the particular form-meaning pairing, or phonestheme, is shown to constitute a statistically unexpected distribution in the lexicon or not.

Corpus studies can inform a researcher about the current state of the lexicon, a critical first step, but importantly are completely uninformative when it comes to questions of whether and how phonesthemes are represented in the minds of language users.

=== Study of patterns in neologisms ===
The second type of approach makes use of the tendency for phonesthemes to participate in the coinage and interpretation of neologisms (i.e., new words in a language). Various studies have demonstrated that, when asked to invent or interpret new words, subjects tend to follow the patterns that are predicted by the phonesthemes in their language. It is known, for example, that the word bangle is a loan from Hindi but speakers tend to associate it with English onomatopoeia like bang. While this approach demonstrates the vitality of phonesthemic patterns, it does not provide any evidence about whether (or how) phonesthemes are represented in the minds of speaker-hearers.

=== Study of linguistic processing patterns ===
The final type of evidence uses the methods of psycholinguistics to study exactly how phonesthemes participate in language processing. One such method is phonesthemic priming — akin to morphological priming — which demonstrates that people represent phonesthemes much as they do typical morphemes, despite the fact that phonesthemes are non-compositional.

Several experiments have been conducted to assess the psychological reality of phonesthemes in English and in Swedish. One such experiment was conducted by Margaret Magnus in 2000 tested subjects' production and recognition of phonesthemes.

Discussions of phonesthesia are often grouped with other phenomena under the rubric of sound symbolism.

=== Cross-linguistic similarities ===
While phonesthemes may be language-specific, it has been pointed out that people may be sensitive to some phonesthemes (e.g. /fl-/, or /tr-/) irrespective of where sound-meaning correspondences are exemplified in the lexicon of their mother tongue (e.g. English, French, Spanish or Macedonian).

== Distribution ==
Phonesthemes have been documented in numerous languages from diverse language families, among them English, Swedish, and other Indo-European languages, Austronesian languages, and Japanese.

While phonesthemes have mostly been identified in the onsets of words and syllables, they can have other forms. There has been some argument that sequences like "-ash" and "-ack" in English also serve as phonesthemes, due to their patterning in words that denote forceful, destructive contact ("smash", "crash", "bash", etc.) and abrupt contact ("smack", "whack", "crack", etc.), respectively.

In addition to the distribution of phonesthemes, linguists consider their motivation. In some cases, there may appear to be good sound-symbolic reasons why phonesthemes would have the form they have. In the case of "-ack", sharing the phonestheme may be the result of such events potentially producing a similar sound. However, critically there are many phonesthemes for which there can be no sound-symbolic basis, such as "gl-", for the simple reason that their meanings (such as 'pertaining to light or vision') entail no sound.

While there are numerous studies on living languages, research is lacking about ancient languages, although the first documented example of phonesthemes dates back to at least the fourth century B.C.: Plato's Cratylus clearly mentioned a gl- phonestheme (a different one from that discussed previously, as those words are not of Greek origin) as well as an st- one and gave an explanation in terms of phonosemantics.

== Examples ==
Examples of phonesthemes in English include:

"cl-": related to a closing motion of a single object, such as "clam", "clamp", "clap", "clasp", "clench", "cling", "clip", "clop", "close", "clutch".

"fl-": related to movement, such as "flap", "flare", "flee", "flick", "flicker", "fling", "flip", "flit", "flitter", "flow", "flutter", "fly", "flurry".

"gl-": related to light, as in "glade", "glance", "glare", "glass", "gleam", "glimmer", "glint", "glisten", "glitter", "gloaming", "gloom", "gloss", "glow".

"kn-": related to protrusion, such as "knee", "knob", "knife", "knot", "knead", "knuckle".

"sl-": appears in words denoting frictionless motion, like "slide", "slick", "sled", and so on. These are themselves a subset of a larger set of words beginning with “sl-“ that are pejorative behaviours, traits, or events: slab, slack, slang, slant, slap, slash, slate, slattern, slay, sleek, sleepy, sleet, slime, slip, slipshod, slit, slither, slobber, slog, slope, sloppy, slosh, sloth, slouch, slough, slovenly, slow, sludge, slug, sluggard, slum, slump, slur, slut, sly.

"sn-": related to the nose or mouth, as in "snack", "snarl", "sneer", "sneeze", "snicker/snigger", "sniff", "sniffle", "snivel", "snoot", "snore", "snorkel", "snort", "snot", "snout", "snub" (as an adjective), "snuff", "snuffle".

"st-": appears in three families of meanings:

- a family of words referring to stability, as in "stable", "stadium", "standard", "stage", "staid", "stake", "stalk", "stall", "stance", "stanchion", "stand", "stare", "stasis", "state", "static", "station", "stationary", "stator", "statue", "stature", "status", "stay", "steady", "stet", "still", "stoll", "store", etc.
- a family of words referring to the idea of strength, of rigidity, as "stout", "steel", "staff", "stave", "staple", etc.
- another family referring to the idea of something pointed or sharp, as in "stab", "staple", "stiletto", "sting", "stitch", "stylet", "stylo", etc.

"str-": denoting something long and thin, as in "straight", "strand", "strap", "straw", "streak", "stream", "string", "strip", "stripe".

"sw-": related to a pendulum-like movement, as in "sway", "sweep", "swerve", "swing", "swipe", "swirl", "swish", "swoop".

"tw-": connotes a twisting motion, as in "twist", "twirl", "tweak", "twill", "tweed", "tweezer", "twiddle", "twine", "twinge".

"-ow(e)l": connotes something sinister, as in "owl", "prowl", "scowl", "growl", "howl", "rowel", "bowel", "jowl".

"-ump": related to a hemispherical shape or pile, as in "bump", "clump", "dump", "jump", "hump", "lump", "mump", "rump", "stump".

== See also ==
- Blend word – Word consisting of two words
- Bouba/kiki effect – Non-arbitrary attachment of sounds to object shapes
- Phonaesthetics – Pleasantness associated with the sounds of words or parts of words
- Phonosemantics – Phenomenon in linguistics
- Reduplication – Linguistic phenomenon
- Sound symbolism – Phenomenon in linguistics
- Sphoṭa – How the mind orders linguistic units into coherent discourse and meaning
