= Isotropic vector field =

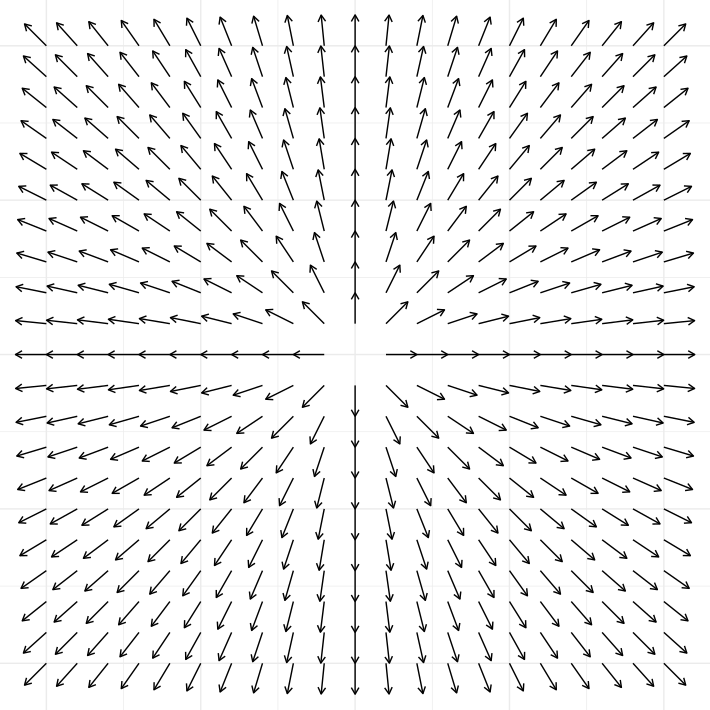
All vectors radiating from the center of this isotropic vector field are uniformly, symmetrically, and invariantly spread across space.

In differential geometry, an isotropic vector field is a concept that refers to a vector field that maintains the same properties in all directions at each point in space.

== Definition ==
A vector field $V$ on a manifold $M$ is said to be isotropic if, for every point $p \in M$, the vector $V(p)$ has the same magnitude and directionality properties in all directions around $p$. This implies that the vector field does not prefer any particular direction, and its characteristics are invariant under rotations about any point.

== Properties ==
- Uniformity: An isotropic vector field exhibits uniform behavior across the manifold. This means that its magnitude and orientation are consistent in all directions at any given point.
- Symmetry: The isotropy of the vector field implies a high degree of symmetry. In physical contexts, this often corresponds to systems that are invariant under rotations, such as isotropic materials in elasticity or cosmological models in general relativity.
- Invariance: The defining feature of isotropic vector fields is their invariance under the action of the rotation group $SO(n)$, where $n$ is the dimension of the manifold. This invariance is a key aspect in the study of symmetries and conservation laws.

== Applications ==
In physics, isotropic vector fields are often used to model systems where directional independence is a fundamental assumption. In cosmological models, the universe is often assumed to be isotropic on large scales, leading to the cosmological principle which states that the universe is homogeneous and isotropic. In certain contexts, electromagnetic fields can be approximated as isotropic, particularly in media where the permittivity and permeability are direction-independent.

In mathematics, isotropic vector fields are studied within the broader context of differential geometry and topology. Understanding isotropic vector fields helps in classifying manifolds based on their symmetry properties. These vector fields can also be useful in the study of geometric structures that exhibit uniformity and symmetry, such as Riemannian manifolds with constant curvature.

== See also ==
- Isotropic manifolds
- Isotropic position
- Isotropic coordinates
