= Mark Dingemanse =

Linguist, researcher in linguistics

Mark Dingemanse (Middelburg, Zeeland, the Netherlands, 1983) is a Dutch linguist. He is an associate professor in Language and Communication at the Centre for Language Studies of Radboud University Nijmegen.

He is also a Senior Investigator in the Multimodal Language and Cognition research group at the Nijmegen Max Planck Institute for Psycholinguistics.

== Life ==
Dingemanse obtained a MA degree in African Languages and Cultures at Leiden University in 2006, and a PhD degree in arts in 2011 at Radboud University Nijmegen. He performed linguistic fieldwork in eastern Ghana and did comparative research on various languages.

He is principal investigator of a research program on Elementary Particles of Conversation, on the small words in everyday language. He and several other researchers were awarded an Ig Nobel Prize for their work on the presence of the word "huh" in all human languages.

== Publications ==
Dingemanse's scholarly papers include:

- The meaning and use of ideophones in Siwu, PhD thesis, Radboud University Nijmegen, 24 October 2011.
- with Francisco Torreira, and N. J. Enfield: Is "Huh?" a Universal Word? Conversational Infrastructure and the Convergent Evolution of Linguistic Items, PLOS One, 2013.
- with Liesenfeld, A.: From text to talk: Harnessing conversational corpora for humane and diversity-aware language technology, in Proceedings of the 60th Annual Meeting of the Association for Computational Linguistics (Volume 1: Long Papers), 5614–5633, 2022, doi: 10.18653/v1/2022.acl-long.385.
- with Heesen, R., et al.: Coordinating social action: A primer for the cross-species investigation of communicative repair, Philosophical Transactions of the Royal Society B: Biological Sciences, 377(1859), 2022. doi: 10.1098/rstb.2021.0110.

== Recognitions ==
- Dingemanse et al. were awarded an Ig Nobel Prize for their work on the presence of the word "huh" in all human languages.
- The Royal Netherlands Academy of Arts and Sciences awarded Dingemanse a Heineken Young Scientists Award in 2020.
