= Chinese exclamative particles =

Feature of vernacular Chinese

The Chinese language involves a number of spoken exclamative words and written onomatopoeia which are used in everyday speech and informal writing. Such "exclamations" have their own Chinese character, but they are rarely used in formal written documents. Rather, they are found in movie subtitles, music lyrics, informal literature and on internet forums.

Many exclamatives contain the 口 mouth radical.

== Use of exclamative particles ==
Exclamative particles are used as a method of recording aspects of human speech which may not be based entirely on meaning and definition. Specific characters are used to record exclamations, as with any other form of Chinese vocabulary, some characters exclusively representing the expression (such as 哼), others sharing characters with alternate words and meanings (such as 可). As with all Chinese characters, exclamative particles span only one syllable, and are formed in the same structure as other Chinese words (for example, words in Mandarin Chinese only end in -n, -ng, -r or a vowel).

The mouth radical 口 found on many exclamative particles represents that the character is a sound, as with onomatopoeia and speech-related words, since phono-semantic compound subset of Chinese characters are classified through meaning by their radicals. For example, 嘿 hei is derived from the mouth radical 口 and the character 黑 hei, which literally means "black", while 啞 originates from the mouth radical plus the character 亞 ya, meaning Asia. The practice occurs from adding a radical in front of a same or similar-sounding word, which then introduces a new word with a new meaning, depending on the radical. Most words represented by the mouth radical have something to do with sounds or speech.

Use of exclamative particles is highly informal, and it is advised that they not be used in formal documents or academic papers, unless it is specifically required to do so (such as the case of narration).

While such exclamations are used in subtitles and descriptions of speech, usage is also popular in social circumstances, such as in text messaging, IM and blogs, where the formality of text is not an issue. Peers may use such particles to address and communicate with each other, just as people in English-speaking regions use words such as "Hey!" to address close friends, or use words like "ugh" or "argh" while online, which are also considered to be informal.

== Parallels in other East Asian languages ==
Similarly in Japanese, particles are used to add expression to speech (e.g. よ, an exclamatory particle), however particles are used more thoroughly and frequently in Japanese than in Chinese. Some Japanese particles are also more commonly used within informal written texts than their Chinese counterparts.

Exclamative particles are also used in the Korean language, such as the use of 에 (e) to represent surprise, although such usage is also considered informal.

== List of Chinese exclamations ==
Character(s)	Pronunciations (Hanyu Pinyin, others)	Description	Example of usage
哈	ha (various tones, usually hā)	laughing	"哈哈，真可笑！" (Haha, very funny!)
吓	hè, "huh (fast, precise)"	used to express anger	"吓，气死我了！"/"嚇，氣死我了！" (Grrr ... I'm so angry ... )
哼	hng, heng	grunt or hmph	"哼，好吧。" (Hmph! OK then / I understand.)
哇	wā	exclamation of wonder, similar to "Wow！" In Taiwan, 哇塞 (wa1sai4) can be used interchangeably.	"哇！很漂亮！" (Wow! So pretty!)
兮	xī, "sheeh" (the "sh" is brief, latent, and shouldn't be stressed)	An exclamation of contempt, or an expression of force (e.g. used in movie subtitles where an actor is injured or in combat)	(when injured)
呵	hē	yelling, yawning	"呵 ..." (when yawning)
啥	shá	question, surprise, contraction of 什么/什麼	"啥？他死了？” (What? He's dead?)
啊	a (various tones)	yelling, exclamation of surprise	"啊,你怎么了？"/"啥,你怎麼了？" (Ah, what's with you?)
吖	a (various tones, used as 啊), yā	used to express discontent
嘿	hēi	equivalent of English "hey"	嘿,你给我来！ (Hey, come here!)
嗨	hāi	"hello", borrowed from English	嗨！你好吗？/嗨你好嗎? (Hi! How are you?)
可	kě, kè	in numbers, represents chuckling	可可可,真逗啊 (*chuckles*, so humorous.)
哑/啞	yā (same as 呀)	hoarse voice
呀	yā	used to express surprise	呀，你来了！ (Oh, you're here!) (alternatively "so you're here" (not expecting) or "you're finally here" (expecting))
呀	ya (toneless)	interrogative particle, used to ask a question, but "softer" than 吗 "ma"
呸	pēi	to spit (in China, parallel to saying "bullshit", i.e. in response to an unlikely statement)	什么？呸！你认为你是谁？/什麼？ (What? Bullshit, who do you think you are?)
哦	é, ó, ò	used in instances of surprise, similar to "oh really?"	哦？是吗？/哦？是嗎？ (Oh? Really?)
哪	nǎ	Usage varies. In "哪 ..." it is equivalent to "so then ...", while in the case where it is placed in front of a question, it is used to emphasize the interrogative (e.g. how, when)	哪…… 你几岁了？/哪…… 你幾歲了？ (So then ... how old are you?)
叽/嘰	jī	sigh of disapproval
嗳/噯	ài	equivalent of English "hey" or "yo", spoken between friends	嗳！很久不见！/嗳！很久不見！ (Yo! Long time no see!)
嗯	ēn, ng	a grunt of acknowledgment, parallel to a phrase such as "I understand"	嗯。 (I understand.)
哎	éi, ai	Similar to English "what?", an interjection of surprise	哎，他死了？ (What? He's dead?)
唉	āi	An exclamation of surprise or pain. Alternatively can be used in the context of "Alas"	唉，好痛啊！ (Ahh! So painful!) OR 唉，原来如此…… (Alas, is that so ... )
诶/誒	āi	An exclamation of confirmation	诶，我明白。 /誒，我明白。 (Yes, I understand.)
啦	la (toneless)	Written depiction of singing; contraction of 了啊 le a	啦啦啦 (Lalala ... ); 他来啦! tā lái la! (他来了 + 啊)
驾/駕	jià	Spoken command for a horse to increase in speed, comparable to English "hyah!" or "giddyup!"	驾！驾！驾！/駕！駕！駕！
怒	nu	Expressing anger, similar to "grrr"	怒 ...
咝/噝	inhale with a hissing sound (in this context)	Response to an annoyance or problem，or a reaction to pain	咝，你很慢啊……(*inhales*, you are very slow ... );，咝，好痛啊！/噝，好痛啊！ (*inhales*, so painful!)
嘚	dé	Equivalent of "Uh-oh", i.e. said upon a mistake or misfortune	嘚 ...
咦	yí	Expression of surprise	咦？这是什么？/咦？這是什麼？ (Eh? What's this?)
啧/嘖	zé (actual sound is a click)	A tongue click, usually as an interjection of approval or admiration. Resembles "tsk tsk tsk".	啧，你看这个整齐的很好！/嘖，你看這個齊的很好！(*tsk*, Look how neatly it's organized!)
嗬	hè	Beijing dialect, interjection indicating surprise or doubt	嗬！什么玩意儿！/嗬！什麼玩意兒！(Hmph, what the hell? (Note: Beijing slang used))
啵	bo, bei	Informal usage of 吧 (feminine, nagging)	我们可以去啵？/我們可以去啵？ (We can go, hmmm?)
噷	hmm	indicates thinking	噷，在哪里？/噷，在哪裡？ (Hmm, where is it?)
呼	hu	puffing (from tiredness)	呼……呼……呼……
吁	xu	shh!
咯	lo	Informal usage of 了 (excitement)	你死定咯！ (You're done for!)
呣	m (nasal)	Indication of thought (as in "hmm"), confirmation, or assertion (as with 恩)	呣，你说什么？ (Hmm? What is this you're on about?) OR 呣，我知道了。 (Hmph, I understand.)
呒/嘸	m	expletive interjection
唔	n	interjection
欸	ǎi, ê	sigh	欸…… (*sigh*)
喽/嘍	lou	calling attention to a situation	"Heads up!"
呗/唄	bei	Indication of evidence in a decision or moral confidence in the outcome of something (located at the end of the sentence)	你不同意，那就算了呗。/你不同意，那就算了唄。 If you disagree, just leave it.

== See also ==
- Chinese pronouns
- Chinese grammar
- Chinese language
- Japanese sound symbolism
