= Japanese sound symbolism =

Large amount of sound-symbolic words in Japanese

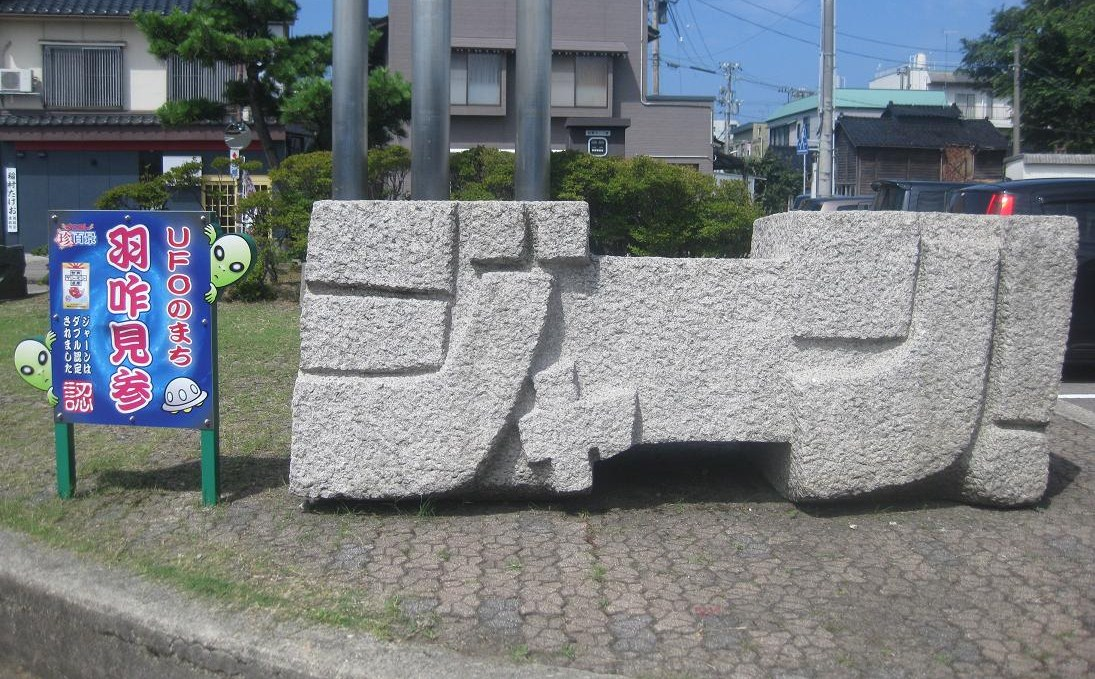
An example of Japanese sound symbolism, 'Tah-dah!' (ジャーン!, Jān!)

The Japanese language has a large inventory of sound symbolic or mimetic words, known in linguistics as ideophones. Such words are found in written as well as spoken Japanese. Known popularly as onomatopoeia, these words do not just imitate sounds but also cover a much wider range of meanings; indeed, many sound-symbolic words in Japanese are for things that make no noise originally, most clearly demonstrated by 'silently' (しーんと, shīnto).

== Categories ==
The sound-symbolic words of Japanese can be classified into four main categories:

Animate phonomime (擬声語, giseigo)
words that mimic sounds made by living things, like a dog's bark (wan-wan).
Inanimate phonomime (擬音語, giongo)
words that mimic sounds made by inanimate objects, like wind blowing or rain falling (zā-zā).
Phenomime (擬態語, gitaigo)
words that depict states, conditions, or manners of the external world (non-auditory senses), such as "damp" or "stealthily".
Psychomime (擬情語, gijōgo)
words that depict psychological states or bodily feelings.

These divisions are not always drawn: sound-symbolism may be referred to generally as onomatopoeia (though strictly this refers to imitative sounds, phonomimes); phonomimes may not be distinguished as animate/inanimate, both being referred to as giseigo; and both phenomimes and psychomimes may be referred to as gitaigo.

In Japanese grammar, sound-symbolic words primarily function as adverbs, though they can also function as verbs (verbal adverbs) with the auxiliary verb suru (する; 'do'), often in the continuous/progressive form shiteiru (している; 'doing'), and as adjectives (participle) with the perfective form of this verb shita (した; 'done'). Just like ideophones in many other languages, they are often introduced by a quotative complementizer to (と). Most sound symbolic words can be applied to only a handful of verbs or adjectives. In the examples below, the classified verb or adjective is placed in square brackets.

Some examples
| Sound Symbolism | Meaning |
|---|---|
| jirojiro (to) [miru] じろじろ(と)[見る] | [see] intently (= stare) |
| kirakira (to) [hikaru] きらきら(と)[光る] | [shine] sparklingly |
| giragira (to) [hikaru] ぎらぎら(と)[光る] | [shine] dazzlingly |
| doki doki [suru] (Note: Unlike the other examples, doki doki is an onomatopoeic word and mimics the sound of two heartbeats.) どきどき[する] | with a throbbing heart |
| guzu guzu [suru] ぐずぐず[する] | procrastinating or dawdling (suru not optional) |
| shiin to [suru] しいんと[する] | [be (lit. do)] quiet (suru not optional) |
| pinpin [shite iru] ぴんぴん[している] | [be (lit. do)] lively (shite iru not optional) |
| yoboyobo ni [naru] (Note: The word ni (に) instead of to (と) is used with naru (なる; 'become').) よぼよぼに[なる] | [become] wobbly-legged (from age) |

== Other types ==
In their Dictionary of Basic Japanese Grammar, Seiichi Makino and Michio Tsutsui point out several other types of sound symbolism in Japanese, that relate phonemes and psychological states. For example, the nasal sound [n] gives a more personal and speaker-oriented impression than the velars [k] and [ɡ]; this contrast can be easily noticed in pairs of synonyms such as node (ので) and kara (から) which both mean 'because', but with the first being perceived as more subjective. This relationship can be correlated with phenomimes containing nasal and velar sounds: while phenomimes containing nasals give the feeling of tactuality and warmth, those containing velars tend to represent hardness, sharpness, and suddenness.

Similarly, i-type adjectives that contain the fricative [ɕ] in the group shi tend to represent human emotive states, such as in the words kanashii (悲しい; 'sad'), sabishii (寂しい; 'lonely'), ureshii (嬉しい; 'happy'), and tanoshii (楽しい; 'enjoyable'). This too is correlated with those phenomimes and psychomimes containing the same fricative sound, for example shitoshito to furu (しとしとと降る; 'to rain / snow quietly') and shun to suru (しゅんとする; 'to be dispirited').

The use of the gemination can create a more emphatic or emotive version of a word, as in the following pairs of words: pitari / pittari (ぴたり / ぴったり; 'tightly'), yahari / yappari (やはり / やっぱり; 'as expected'), hanashi / ppanashi (放し / っ放し; 'leaving, having left [something] in a particular state'), and many others.

== See also ==
- Chinese exclamative particles
- Kuchi shōga (system for "pronouncing" drum sounds)
- Onomatopoeia
- Sound symbolism
- Bouba/kiki effect

== Sources ==
- Akita, Kimi (2009). A Grammar of Sound-Symbolic Words in Japanese: Theoretical Approaches to Iconic and Lexical Properties of Japanese Mimetics (PDF) (PhD). Kobe University. Archived from the original (PDF) on 2019-08-30.
- Akutsu, Satoru (1994). A Practical Guide to Mimetic Expressions Through Pictures. ALC Press, ISBN 4-87234-322-0.
- Hamano, Shoko (1998). The sound-symbolic system of Japanese. Tokyo: Kurosio.
- Hasada, Rie (2001). "Meanings of Japanese sound-symbolic emotion words". In Harkins, Jean & Anna Wierzbicka (eds.) Emotions in Crosslinguistic Perspective (Cognitive Linguistics Research 17). Berlin, New York: Mouton de Gruyter, pp. 217–253.
- Kita, Sotaro (1997). "Two-dimensional semantic analysis of Japanese mimetics" (PDF). Ling. 35 (2): 379–416. doi:10.1515/ling.1997.35.2.379. hdl:21.11116/0000-0002-C12C-3. S2CID 144380452. Archived (PDF) from the original on 2023-09-05.
- Martin, Samuel E. (1964). "Speech labels in Japan and Korea", in Dell Hymes (ed.), Language in Culture and Society: A reader in linguistics and anthropology. New York: Harper and Row.
- Nuckolls, Janis B. (2004). "To Be or to Be Not Ideophonically Impoverished". In Wai Fong Chiang; Elaine Chun; Laura Mahalingappa; Siri Mehus (eds.). SALSA XI: Proceedings of the Eleventh Annual Symposium About Language and Society — Austin. Austin: University of Texas Department of Linguistics. pp. 131–142.
- Ono, Shuuichi (ed.) (1989). A Practical Guide to Japanese-English Onomatopoeia and Mimesis. Tokyo: Hokuseidoo.
- Seiichi Makino and Michio Tsutsui, Dictionary of Basic Japanese Grammar, The Japan Times, 1986. ISBN 4-7890-0454-6.
- Shibatani, Masayoshi (1990). The Languages of Japan. Cambridge: Cambridge University Press. ISBN 978-0-521-36918-3. (esp p. 153vv).
- Voeltz, Erhard Friedrich Karl; Kilian-Hatz, Christa, eds. (2001). Ideophones. Typological Studies in Language. Vol. 44. Amsterdam: John Benjamins Publishing. ISBN 978-90-272-2946-5. Archived from the original on 2013-05-02.
