= Bouba/kiki effect =

Non-arbitrary attachment of sounds to object shapes

This picture is used as a test to demonstrate that people may not attach sounds to shapes arbitrarily. When given the names "kiki" and "bouba", many cultural and linguistic communities worldwide robustly tend to label the shape on the left "kiki" and the one on the right "bouba".

The bouba–kiki effect (/ˈbuːbə ˈkiːkiː/ BOO-bə KEE-kee), or takete–maluma phenomenon, is a non-arbitrary mental association between certain speech sounds and certain visual shapes. The most typical research finding is that people, when presented with nonsense words, tend to associate certain "soft" sounds (like bouba and maluma) with a rounded shape and other "hard" sounds (like kiki and takete) with a spiky shape. Its discovery dates back to the 1920s, when psychologists Uznadze and Köhler documented experimental participants as connecting nonsense words to shapes in consistent ways.

There is a strong general tendency towards the effect worldwide. It has been robustly confirmed across a majority of cultures and languages in which it has been researched; examples include English-speaking American university students, Tamil speakers in India, speakers of certain languages with no writing system, young children, infants, and (though to a much lesser degree) the congenitally blind. It has also been shown to occur with familiar names. The effect has also been shown to extend to chickens and dogs. The bouba–kiki effect is one form of sound symbolism.

== Research ==
=== Discovery ===
This effect was first observed by Georgian psychologist Dimitri Uznadze in a 1924 paper. He conducted an experiment with 10 participants who were given a list with nonsense words, shown six drawings for five seconds each, then instructed to pick a name for the drawing from the list of given words. He describes the different "strategies" participants developed to match words to drawings and quotes their reasoning. He also describes situations where participants described very specific forms that they associated with a nonsense word, without reference to the shown drawings. He develops a theory of four factors that influence the way names for objects are decided.

In total, there were 42 words. For one particular drawing, 45% picked the same word. For three others, the percentages were 40%. Uznadze points out that this is significantly more overlap than one could expect, given the high number of possible words. He speculates that there must therefore be certain regularities "which the human soul follows in the process of name-giving".

German American psychologist Wolfgang Köhler referred to Uznadze's experiment in his 1929 book Gestalt Psychology which showed two forms and asked readers which shape was called "takete" and which was called "maluma". Although he does not say so outright, Köhler implies that there is a strong preference to pair the jagged shape with "takete" and the rounded shape with "maluma".

In 2001, V. S. Ramachandran and Edward Hubbard at the University of California, San Diego, presented the words "kiki" and "bouba" along with new figures as alternatives to the stimuli used by Köhler. They stated that when asked to guess, 95% of people will select the curvy shape as "bouba" and the jagged one as "kiki".

=== Extension to other contexts ===
==== Cross-language contexts ====
There is a strong general tendency towards the effect worldwide. It has been robustly confirmed across a majority of cultures and languages in which it has been researched. A 2022 study by Cwiek et al, that found evidence supporting the idea that the bouba/kiki effect is a cross-cultural phenomenon. 917 participants speaking 25 different languages, with 10 different writing systems, maintain a higher than chance consistency in bouba/kiki identification, intuitively associating the "bouba" with a rounded shape and "kiki" with a sharp, pointed shape, regardless of their native language, though the effect is stronger in some languages than others. It also supports that Roman orthography is a factor that could enhance the bouba/kiki effect. However, this biasing effect of orthography is rather weak since the participants that speak languages with Roman orthography are only marginally more likely to show the bouba/kiki effect.

==== Cross-age contexts ====
Daphne Maurer and colleagues showed that even children as young as 2 1/2 years old may show this preference.

Work by Özge Öztürk and colleagues in 2013 showed that even 4-month-old infants have the same sound–shape mapping biases as adults and toddlers. Infants are able to differentiate between congruent trials (pairing an angular shape with "kiki" or a curvy shape with "bubu") and incongruent trials (pairing a curvy shape with "kiki" or an angular shape with "bubu"). Infants looked longer at incongruent pairings than at congruent pairings. Infants' mapping was based on the combination of consonants and vowels in the words, and neither consonants nor vowels alone sufficed for mapping.

These results suggest that some sound–shape mappings precede language learning, and may in fact aid in language learning by establishing a basis for matching labels to referents and narrowing the hypothesis space for young infants. Adults in this study, like infants, used a combination of consonant and vowel information to match the labels they heard with the shapes they saw. However, this was not the only strategy that was available to them. Adults, unlike infants, were also able to use consonant information alone and vowel information alone to match the labels to the shapes, albeit less frequently than the consonant–vowel combination. When vowels and consonants were put in conflict, adults used consonants more often than vowels.

==== Other contexts where the effect is present ====
The effect has also been shown to emerge in other contexts, such as when words are paired with evaluative meanings (with "bouba" words associated with positive concepts and "kiki" words associated with negative concepts) or when the words to be paired are existing first names, suggesting that some familiarity with the linguistic stimuli does not eliminate the effect. A study showed that individuals will pair names such as "Molly" with round silhouettes, and names such as "Kate" with sharp silhouettes. Moreover, individuals will associate different personality traits with either group of names (e.g., easygoingness with "round names"; determination with "sharp names"). This may hint at a role of abstract concepts in the effect.

==== Animals ====
A 2026 study at the University of Padua discovered the effect was also present in one- and three-day-old baby chickens. A 2026 study undertaken at the University of Parma showed that the effect was also seen in adult dogs.

=== Contexts where the effect is smaller or absent ===
Other research suggests that this effect does not occur in all communities, and it appears that the effect breaks if the sounds do not make licit words in the language. The bouba–kiki effect seems to be dependent on a long sensitive period, with high visual capacities in childhood being necessary for its typical development. Although the congenitally blind have been reported to show a bouba–kiki effect, they show a much smaller one for touched shapes than sighted individuals do for visual shapes.

=== Languages with little observed effect ===
A major 2022 study by Cwiek et al showed that certain languages, namely Mandarin Chinese, Turkish, Romanian, and Albanian, on average showed lower-than-50% matches for both associating bouba with roundedness and kiki with jaggedness. However, the authors consider their analysis conservative and not clear enough to confirm if these four definitively lacked the bouba–kiki phenomenon. For example, the phonetic structures of these languages or their participants' cultural associations with sound and shape could have led to the weaker correlations observed.

=== Neuroscience ===
In 2019, Nathan Peiffer-Smadja and Laurent Cohen published the first study using fMRI to explore the bouba–kiki effect. They found that prefrontal activation is stronger to mismatching (bouba with spiky shape) than to matching (bouba with round shape) stimuli. A subsequent study by Kelly McCormick and colleagues reported a similar pattern of greater activation for mismatched word-shape stimuli, but with most activity in parietal regions including the intraparietal sulcus and supramarginal gyrus, regions known to play a role in sensory association and perceptual-motor processing. Peiffer-Smadja and Cohen also found that sound-shape matching also influences activations in the auditory and visual cortices, suggesting an effect of matching at an early stage in sensory processing.

=== Implications for understanding language ===
The bouba–kiki effect is one form of sound symbolism.

Ramachandran and Hubbard suggest that the kiki/bouba effect has implications for the evolution of language, because it suggests that the naming of objects is not completely arbitrary. The rounded shape may most commonly be named "bouba" because the mouth makes a more rounded shape to produce that sound while a more taut, angular mouth shape is needed to make the sounds in "kiki". Alternatively, the distinction may be between coronal or dorsal consonants like /k/ and labial consonants like /b/, or, as Fort and Schwartz suggest, the difference may be attributed to the noise a "bouba" shape makes when bounced (lower frequency and more continuous) in comparison to a spiked object.

Additionally, it was shown that it is not only different consonants (e.g., voiceless versus voiced) and different vowel qualities (e.g., /a/ versus /i/) that play a role in the effect, but also vowel quantity (long versus short vowels). In one study, participants rated words containing long vowels to refer to longer objects and short vowels to short objects, at least for languages that make a vowel length distinction. The presence of these "synesthesia-like mappings" suggest that this effect may be the neurological basis for sound symbolism, in which sounds are non-arbitrarily mapped to objects and events in the world. Research has also indicated that the effect may be a case of ideasthesia, a phenomenon in which activations of concepts (inducers) evoke perception-like experiences (concurrents). The name comes from the Greek idea and aisthesis, meaning "sensing concepts" or "sensing ideas", and was introduced by in 2009 Danko Nikolić. However, it has been reported that the bouba-kiki effect is also exhibited by newly hatched chickens and in adult dogs. Therefore, such sound-shape correspondences may belong to a set of innate cross-modal associations that are shared across species, rather than being a speech-related phenomenon that is distinctive to humans.

== See also ==
- Color symbolism – Use of color for symbolic purposes
- Japanese sound symbolism – Large amount of sound-symbolic words in Japanese
- Origin of language – Relationship between language and human evolution
- Semiotics – Study of signs
- Universal language – Hypothetical language
- Cratylism – Philosophical theory
