= Congenital blindness =

Blindness present at birth

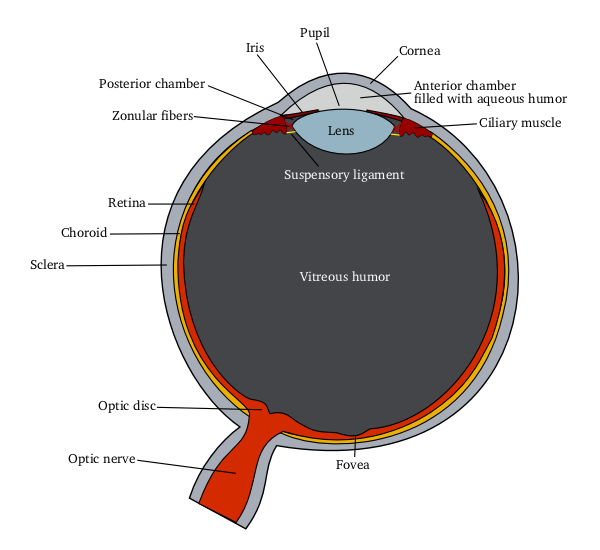
Human eye anatomy

Congenital blindness is blindness present at birth. Congenital blindness is sometimes used interchangeably with "childhood blindness", however current literature has various definitions of both terms. Childhood blindness encompasses multiple diseases and conditions present in ages up to 16 years old, which can result in permanent blindness or severe visual impairment over time. Congenital blindness is a hereditary disease and can be treated by gene therapy. Visual loss in children or infants can occur either at the prenatal stage (during the time of conception or intrauterine period) or postnatal stage (immediately after birth). There are multiple possible causes of congenital blindness. In general, 60% of congenital blindness cases are contributed from prenatal stage and 40% are contributed from inherited disease. However, most of the congenital blindness cases show that it can be avoidable or preventable with early treatment.

== Signs and symptoms ==
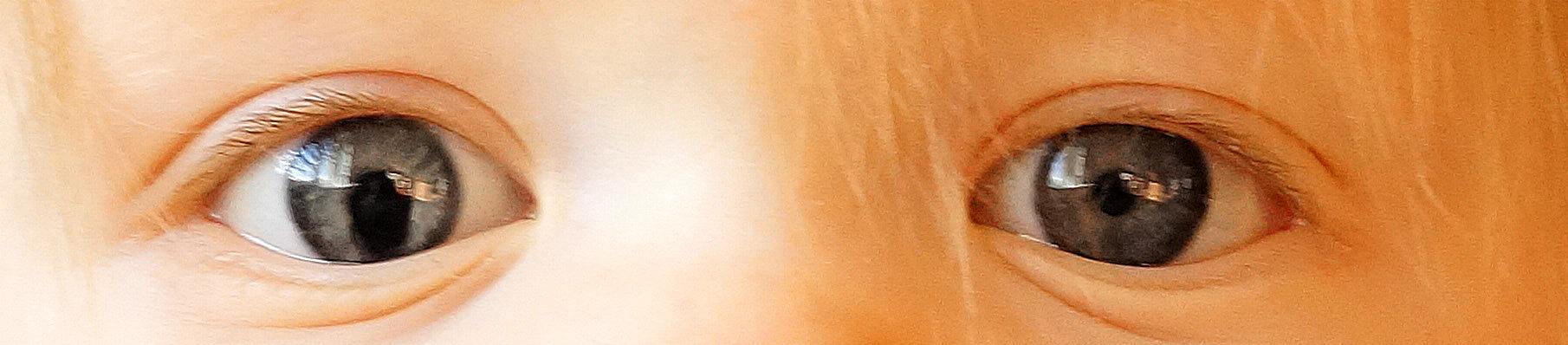
Coloboma in the right eye of a 10-month-old child

There are two categories in which the signs of congenital blindness can be classified. The first category pertains to consistently poor vision, such as not displaying preferential looking when presented with high-contrast visual stimuli. The second category encompasses severe ocular anomalies, such as Anophthalmos (born with only one eye or lost both eyes), Microphthalmos (underdevelopment of one or both eyes), and Coloboma (a portion of tissue missing in the eye or eyes).

== Causes ==
=== Prenatal ===
Retinopathy of prematurity

- Premature Birth
- Refractive error
- Congenital cataract
- Retinopathy of prematurity
- Infection
  - Congenital toxoplasmosis
  - Congenital cytomegalovirus infection

==== Mutations ====
Gene alterations leading to retinal dystrophies or congenital malformations may cause congenital and childhood blindness. Examples of these include:

- Microphthalmia
- Anophthalmia
- Coloboma
- Leber's congenital amaurosis (LCA) is a collection of inherited, degenerative eye disorders that can reduce the strength of visual clarity or sharpness in infants and can cause childhood blindness. These eye disorders are mostly autosomal recessive diseases, and diagnoses of LCA are linked to multiple gene variants, including the Retinal pigment epithelium-specific 65 kDa (RPE65) gene. The RPE65 protein is essential in the process of vision, as it contributes to the regeneration process of the visual pigment rhodopsin. During the normal visual cycle, all-trans-retinyl palmitate, a stored form of vitamin A, binds and activates retinoid isomerohydrolase. This enzyme converts all-trans-retinyl palmitate into 11-cis-retinol, which is further oxidized into 11-cis-retinal. This compound binds with apo-rhodopsin to become rhodopsin, concluding the visual cycle. Biochemical studies suggest that the RPE65 protein binds with all-trans-retinyl palmitate and helps bring it to isomerohydrolase. RPE65-associated LCA is characterized by dysfunctional isomerization activity and early-onset blindness.

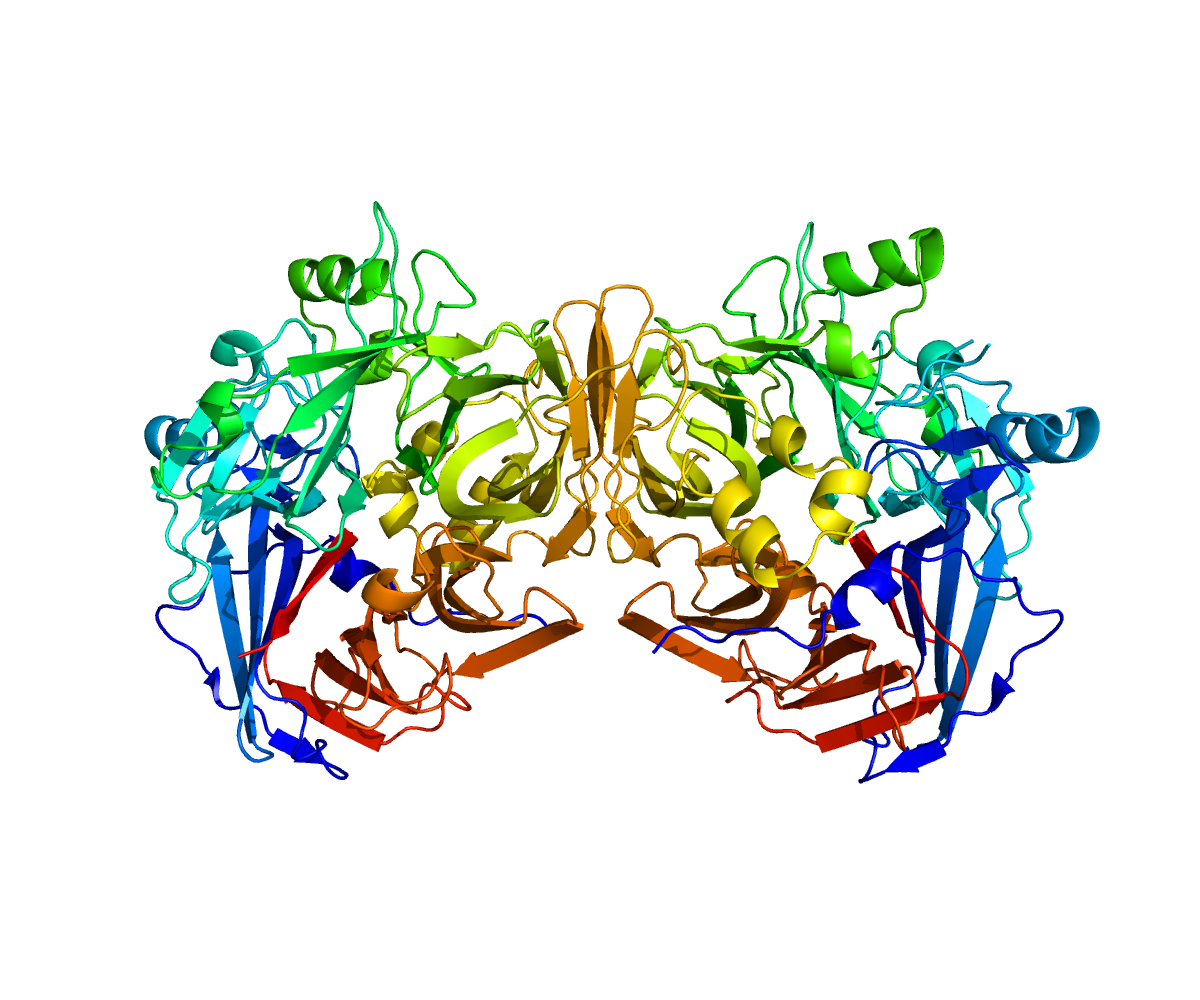
RPE65

- Retinoblastoma is the most common intraocular malignancy present in children younger than 5 years old. The eye cancer can be passed down genetically as an autosomal dominant condition.

=== Postnatal ===
- Measles
- Ophtalmia neonatorum

== Screening ==
As per the CDC recommendations, newborns should undergo an eye examination while they are still in the hospital nursery. It is equally important for caregivers to continue monitoring their eyes and vision system throughout their childhood and adolescence.

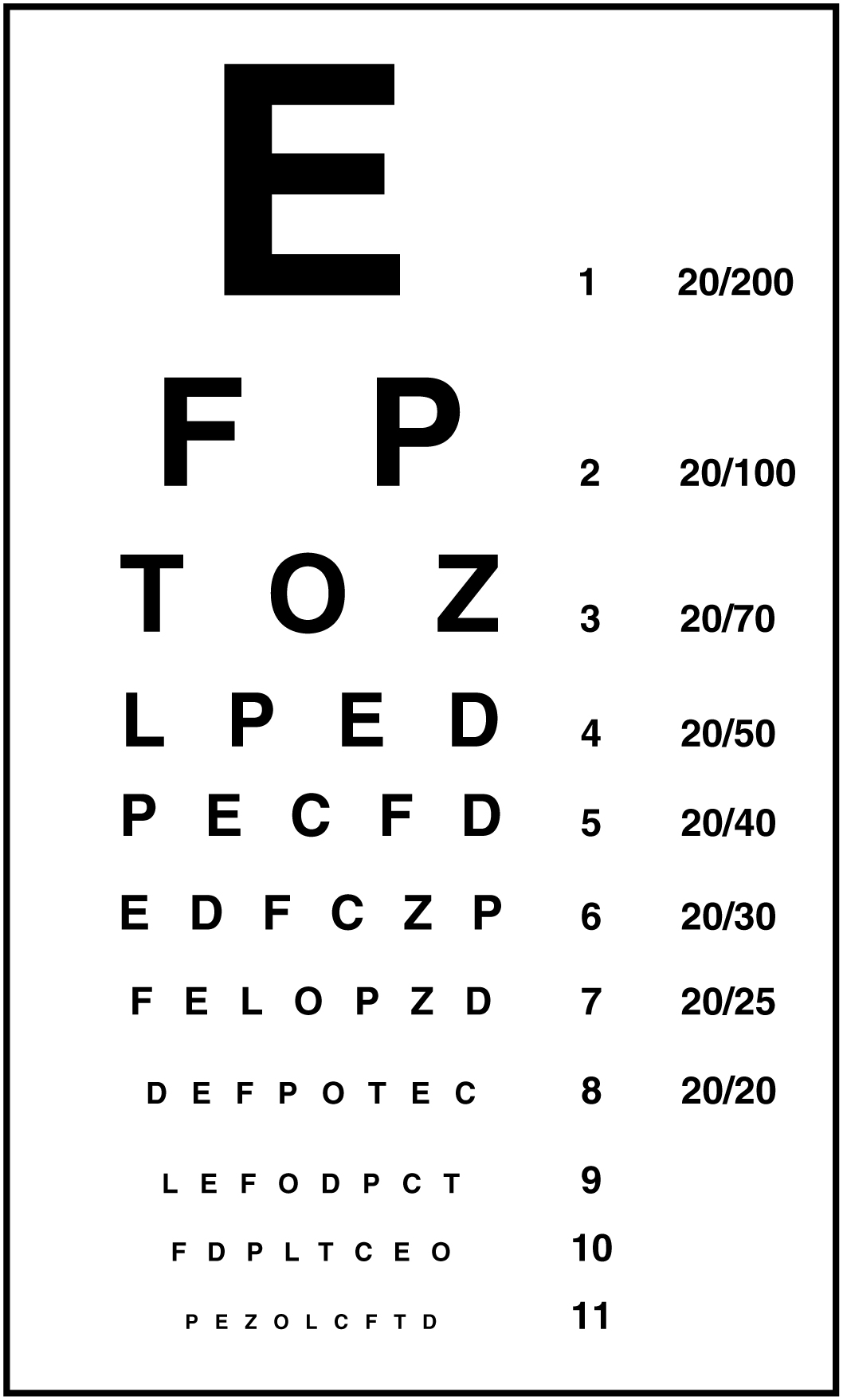
Screening test: Snellen Chart

The following methods are used to test infant's vision:

| Type of visual impairment | Screening tests |
|---|---|
| Visual acuity (Being able to tell and recognize the sharp and well-defined visual information when there is a noticeable contrast between light and dark areas) | HOTV eye test; Picture identification tests; Tumbling E; Snellen |
| Strabismus (Squint; eyes are not looking in the same direction) | Hirschberg test (corneal light reflex test); Cover-uncover test (cross cover test); Bruckner test (red reflex test) |
| Anisometropia (Two eyes have varying refractive power) | Stereo Smile; Random Dot E; TNO |
| Refractive errors: Myopia (nearsighted); Hyperopia (farsighted); Astigmatism; Anisometropia; Presbyopia (age-related farsightedness) | Photorefraction; Autorefractive screening |

== Diagnosis ==
Pediatric nurses, medical officers and pediatricians trained in eye screening could detect small or large eyeballs, nystagmus, strabismus, "white pupils" and birth defects like coloboma and aniridia. People that are pregnant from families with a history of congenital blindness will be closely monitored and need to carry out genetic testing in order to identify whether there is a mutation or not.

Red reflex testing is done in neonates, infants, and children to assess eye and vision function. Red reflex testing is a low-cost preventative examination that should be completed at birth before discharge. According to the American Academy of Ophthalmology, neonates found with eye abnormalities should be seen by a pediatric ophthalmologist immediately.

== Epidemiology ==
Of all the children in the world, about 19 million of them are estimated to be visually impaired or blind. There is evidence that the prevalence of visual impairment or blindness in children is much higher as many studies use data that are at risk bias and miss many children who fall under multiple categories of disadvantage (i.e. female, rural areas). Many of the cases occurring in low-income countries in the previous two decades were a result of low socioeconomic status and its association with disease and nutritional deficiencies, such as vitamin A deficiency. However, recent studies have shown that most cases of visually impaired children are a result of causes such as cerebral visual impairment and optic nerve anomalies. This is due to a decrease in preventable or avoidable causes of blindness with the improvement and focus on maternal and neonatal healthcare worldwide.

There is limited knowledge on how childhood blindness affects long-term quality of life as there have not been many studies done to assess overall outcomes. However, there is data that supports the functional burden of blindness for both individuals that later affect society, such as education and employment. Some potential questionnaires for gathering and assessing quality of life have been tested but not developed nor fully implemented in the healthcare system. Treatments currently available for those who are diagnosed are not readily accessible in developing countries due to financial and institutional limitations.

== Research ==
Leber congenital amaurosis (LCA) has been a major focus in the development of gene therapy for treatment of the disease, as it is the most severe form of congenital blindness and accounts for 5% of all inherited retinal diseases cases. Research on gene therapy is aimed at slowing retinal degeneration and improving visual function. Genetic testing is used to supplement clinical diagnosis and identify eligibility for future gene therapy use. LCA diagnosis occurs at birth or within the first few months of birth, with all cases following similar signs, but some genotypes present with a more severe form of the disease. There has since been a push for further research to investigate the role of gene therapy in the treatment of inherited retinal dystrophy. In 2017, the U.S. Food and Drug Administration approved Voretigene neparvovec (Luxturna), a gene therapy medication used for the treatment of retinal dystrophy.

Gene therapy treatment is done in the outpatient setting. Patients come to the hospital for the treatment, then return home. Patients do not need to be strictly monitored or stay in the hospital. The gene therapy treatment is in vivo which involves the use of a delivery vector to transmit the therapeutic gene into the targeted cells. People with congenital amaurosis will present with reduced or absent levels of retinal pigment epithelium 65 kDa protein (RPE65). Luxturna works by delivering a normal copy of the RPE65 gene. The delivery vector uses a recombinant adeno-associated virus (AAV) carrying the RPE65 gene (AAV2-hRPE65v2). The procedure is a single injection of the AAV2-hRPE65v2 therapeutic gene into the unilateral subretinal of the eye. People must meet the following requirements to be eligible for Luxturna gene therapy: biallelic disease-causing RPE65 mutation, older than one year in age, no surgical contraindications, detectable photoreceptors and RPE, and measurable vision. Luxturna has now become the standard of care for the treatment of inherited retinal dystrophy. Due to the nature and rareness of inherited retinal disease, Luxturna was granted orphan drug designation by the FDA, which incentivizes pharmaceutical companies to continue innovating because tax credits are granted for qualified clinical trials.
