= Sound symbolism =

Phenomenon in linguistics

In linguistics, sound symbolism is the perceptual similarity between speech sounds and concept meanings. It is a form of linguistic iconicity. For example, the English word ding may sound similar to the actual sound of a bell.

Linguistic sound may be perceived as similar to not only sounds, but also to other sensory properties, such as size, vision, touch, or smell, or abstract domains, such as emotion or value judgment. Such correspondence between linguistic sound and meaning may significantly affect the form of spoken languages.

== History ==
=== Plato and the Cratylus Dialogue ===
In Cratylus, Plato has Socrates commenting on the origins and correctness of various names and words. When Hermogenes asks if he can provide another hypothesis on how signs come into being (his own is simply 'convention'), Socrates initially suggests that they fit their referents in virtue of the sounds they are made of:

Now the letter rho, as I was saying, appeared to the imposer of names an excellent instrument for the expression of motion; and he frequently uses the letter for this purpose: for example, in the actual words rein and roe he represents motion by rho; also in the words tromos (trembling), trachus (rugged); and again, in words such as krouein (strike), thrauein (crush), ereikein (bruise), thruptein (break), kermatixein (crumble), rumbein (whirl): of all these sorts of movements he generally finds an expression in the letter R, because, as I imagine, he had observed that the tongue was most agitated and least at rest in the pronunciation of this letter, which he therefore used in order to express motion

— Cratylus.

However, faced by an overwhelming number of counterexamples given by Hermogenes, Socrates has to admit that "my first notions of original names are truly wild and ridiculous".

=== Upanishads ===
The Upanishads and Vyākaraṇa contain a lot of material about sound symbolism, for instance:

The mute consonants represent the earth, the sibilants the sky, the vowels heaven. The mute consonants represent fire, the sibilants air, the vowels the sun… The mute consonants represent the eye, the sibilants the ear, the vowels the mind.

— Aitareya Aranyaka III.2.6.2.

The concept of Sphota and Nirukta is also based on this.

=== Shingon Buddhism ===
Kūkai, the founder of Shingon, wrote his Sound, word, reality in the 9th century which relates all sounds to the voice of the Dharmakaya Buddha.

=== Early Western phonosemantics ===
The idea of phonosemantics was sporadically discussed during the Middle Ages and the Renaissance. In 1690, Locke wrote against the idea in An Essay Concerning Human Understanding. His argument was that if there were any connection between sounds and ideas, then we would all be speaking the same language, but this is an overgeneralisation. Leibniz's book New Essays on Human Understanding published in 1765 contains a point by point critique of Locke's essay. Leibniz picks up on the generalization used by Locke and adopts a less rigid approach: clearly there is no perfect correspondence between words and things, but neither is the relationship completely arbitrary, although he seems vague about what that relationship might be.

=== Modern linguistics ===
Modern linguistics has been seen as opposing sound symbolism, beginning with Ferdinand de Saussure (1857–1913), considered the founder of modern 'scientific' linguistics. Central to what de Saussure says about words are two related statements: First, he says that "the sign is arbitrary". He considers the words that we use to indicate things and concepts could be any words – they are essentially just a consensus agreed upon by the speakers of a language and have no discernible pattern or relationship to the thing. Second, he says that, because words are arbitrary, they have meaning only in relation to other words. A dog is a dog because it is not a cat or a mouse or a horse, etc. These ideas have permeated the study of words since the 19th century.

== Types ==
=== Onomatopoeia ===
Onomatopoeia refers to words that imitate sounds. Some examples in English are bow-wow or meow, each representing the sound of a dog or a cat.

=== Ideophone ===
An ideophone is "a member of an open lexical class of marked words that depict sensory imagery". Unlike onomatopoeia, an ideophone refers to words that depict any sensory domain, such as vision or touch. Examples are Korean mallang-mallang 말랑말랑 'soft' and Japanese kira-kira キラキラ 'shiny'. Ideophones are heavily present in many African and East/Southeast Asian languages, such as Japanese, Thai, Cantonese and Xhosa. Their form is very often reduplicated, but not necessarily so.

=== Phonaesthemes ===
A phonaestheme is a sub-morphemic sequence of sounds that are associated to a certain range of meanings. A well-known example is English gl-, which is present in many words related to light or vision, such as gleam, glow, or glare. Since it is submorphemic, gl- itself is not a morpheme, and it does not form compounds with other morphemes: -eam, -ow, and -are have no meaning of their own. Phonaesthemes, however, are not necessarily iconic, as they may be language-specific and may not iconically resemble the meaning they are associated to.

=== Sound symbolism in basic vocabulary ===
Blasi et al. (2016), Joo (2020), and Johansson et al. (2020) demonstrated that in the languages around the world, certain concepts in the basic vocabulary (such as the Swadesh list or the Leipzig–Jakarta list) tend to be represented by words containing certain sounds. Below are some of the phonosemantic associations confirmed by the three studies:

| Concept | Sound |
|---|---|
| Breast | Nasal sounds (e. g. /m/) |
| Knee | Rounded vowels (e. g. /o/) |
| Tongue | Lateral consonants (e. g. /l/) |

=== Magnitude symbolism ===
High front vowels, such as /i/, are known to be perceptually associated to small size, whereas low and/or back vowels, such as /u/ or /a/, are usually associated with big size. This phenomenon is known as magnitude symbolism.

Sapir (1929) showed that, when asked which of the two tables, named mil and mal, is bigger than the other, many people choose mal to be bigger than mil. This phenomenon is not only observable in pseudowords, but present throughout English vocabulary as well.

=== Deictic symbolism ===
In many languages, the proximal demonstrative pronoun ('this') tends to have high front vowels (such as /i/), whereas the distal demonstrative pronoun ('that') tends to have low and/or back vowels (such as /u/). Examples include: English this and that, French ceci and cela, Finnish tämä and tuo, and Indonesian ini and itu.

=== Pronominal symbolism ===
First person pronouns (me) and second person pronouns (you) tend to contain a nasal sound. Joo (2020) suggests that this may be related to the infant's tendency of using the nasal sound to seek the attention of the caretaker.

=== Phoneme symbolism (Bouba-kiki effect) ===
Which of the two shapes is bouba, and which one is kiki?

Wolfgang Köhler introduced what is known as the Takete-Maluma phenomenon. When presented two shapes, one being curvy and another being spiky, and asked which one is called Takete and which one is called Maluma, participants are more likely to associate the name Takete to the spiky shape and the name Maluma to the curvy shape.

Following Ramachandran and Hubbard in 2001, this phenomenon is now more commonly known as the bouba/kiki effect, and has been demonstrated to be valid across different cultures and languages.

=== Tactile sound symbolism ===
Bilabial consonants have been demonstrated to be linked to the perception of softness, arguably due to the soft texture of human lips.

The trilled R is frequent in words for 'rough' while infrequent in words for 'smooth'.

== Use in commerce ==
Sound symbolism is used in commerce for the names of products and even companies themselves. For example, a car company may be interested in how to name their car to make it sound faster or stronger. Furthermore, sound symbolism can be used to create a meaningful relationship between a company's brand name and the brand mark itself. Sound symbolism can relate to the color, shade, shape, and size of the brand mark.

== See also ==
- Cratylism
- Ideasthesia
- Ideophone
- Imitation of natural sounds in various cultures
- Onomatopoeia
- Phono-semantic matching
- Phonestheme
- Phonaesthetics
- Sign (linguistics)
- Zaum
