= Tetanic contraction =

Type of muscle contraction

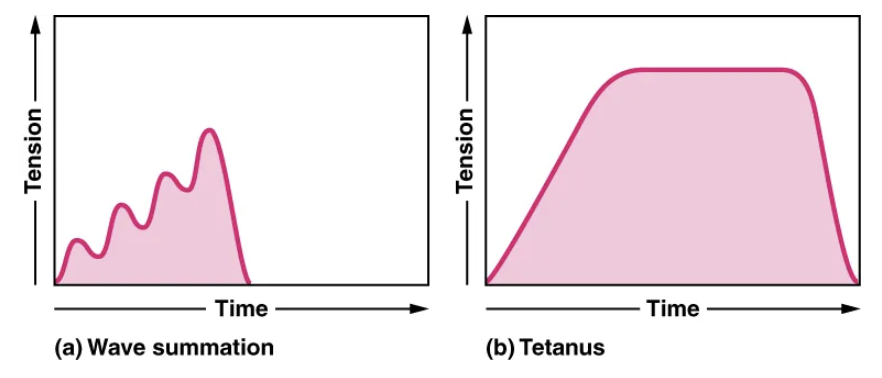
a) The excitation-contraction coupling effects of successive motor neuron signaling is added together which is referred to as wave summation. The bottom of each wave, the end of the relaxation phase, represents the point of stimulus. (b) When the stimulus frequency is so high that the relaxation phase disappears completely, the contractions become continuous; this is called tetanus.

A tetanic contraction (also called tetanized state, tetanus, or physiologic tetanus, the latter to differentiate from the disease called tetanus) is a sustained muscle contraction evoked when the motor nerve that innervates a skeletal muscle emits action potentials at a very high rate. During this state, a motor unit has been maximally stimulated by its motor neuron and remains that way for some time. This occurs when a muscle's motor unit is stimulated by multiple impulses at a sufficiently high frequency. Each stimulus causes a twitch. If stimuli are delivered slowly enough, the tension in the muscle will relax between successive twitches. If stimuli are delivered at high frequency, the twitches will overlap, resulting in tetanic contraction. A tetanic contraction can be either unfused (incomplete) or fused (complete). An unfused tetanus is when the muscle fibers do not completely relax before the next stimulus because they are being stimulated at a fast rate; however there is a partial relaxation of the muscle fibers between the twitches. Fused tetanus is when there is no relaxation of the muscle fibers between stimuli and it occurs during a high rate of stimulation. A fused tetanic contraction is the strongest single-unit twitch in contraction. When tetanized, the contracting tension in the muscle remains constant in a steady state. This is the maximal possible contraction. During tetanic contractions, muscles can shorten, lengthen or remain constant length.

Tetanic contraction is usually normal (such as when holding up a heavy box). Muscles often exhibit some level of tetanic activity, leading to muscle tone, in order to maintain posture; for example, in a crouching position, some muscles require sustained contraction to hold the position. Tetanic contraction can exist in a variety of states, including isotonic and isometric forms—for example, lifting a heavy box off the floor is isotonic, but holding it at the elevated position is isometric. Isotonic contractions place muscles in a constant tension but the muscle length changes, while isometric contractions hold a constant muscle length.

Voluntary sustained contraction is a normal (physiologic) process (as in the crouching or box-holding examples), but involuntary sustained contraction exists on a spectrum from physiologic to disordered (pathologic). Muscle tone is a healthy form of involuntary sustained partial contraction. In comparison with tetanic contraction in an isometric state (such as holding up a heavy box for several minutes), it differs only in the percentage of motor units participating at any moment and the frequency of neural signals; but the low percentage and low frequency in healthy tone are the key factors defining it as healthy (and not tetanic). Involuntary sustained contraction of a hypertonic type, however, is a pathologic process. On the mild part of the spectrum, cramps, spasms, and even tetany are often temporary and nonsevere. On the moderate to severe parts of the spectrum are dystonia, trismus, pathologic tetanus, and other movement disorders featuring involuntary sustained strong contractions of skeletal muscle.

== See also ==
- Muscle fatigue
