= Perimysium =

Layer of connective tissue that groups muscle fibers into bundles

- Structure of a skeletal muscle. (Perimysium labeled at top center.)

Details

Identifiers
- Latin: perimysium
- TA98: A04.0.00.042
- TA2: 2008
- TH: H3.03.00.0.00005
- FMA: 9728

Perimysium is a sheath of dense irregular connective tissue that groups muscle fibers into bundles (anywhere between 10 and 100 or more) or fascicles.

Studies of muscle physiology suggest that the perimysium plays a role in transmitting lateral contractile movements. This hypothesis is strongly supported in one exhibition of the existence of "perimysial junctional plates" in ungulate flexor carpi radialis muscles. The overall comprehensive organization of the perimysium collagen network, as well as its continuity and disparateness, however, have still not been observed and described thoroughly everywhere within the muscle. It contains mainly type I collagen, then type III and V in descending order.

== See also ==
- Connective tissue in skeletal muscle
- Endomysium
- Epimysium
