= Endomysium =

Connective tissue ensheathing individual muscle fibres

- Structure of a skeletal muscle. (Endomysium labeled at bottom center.)

Identifiers
- TA98: A04.0.00.043
- TA2: 2007
- TH: H3.03.00.0.00004
- FMA: 9729

The endomysium, meaning within the muscle, is a wispy layer of areolar connective tissue that ensheaths each individual muscle fiber, or muscle cell. It also contains capillaries and nerves. It overlies the muscle fiber's cell membrane: the sarcolemma. Endomysium is the deepest and smallest component of muscle connective tissue. This thin layer helps provide an appropriate chemical environment for the exchange of calcium, sodium, and potassium, which is essential for the excitation and subsequent contraction of a muscle fiber.

Endomysium combines with perimysium and epimysium to create the collagen fibers of tendons, providing the tissue connection between muscles and bones by indirect attachment. It connects with perimysium using intermittent perimysial junction plates.

Collagen is the major protein that composes connective tissues like endomysium. Endomysium has been shown to contain mainly type I and type III collagen components, and type IV and type V in very minor amounts. Others have found type IV and type V more common.

The term cardiac skeleton is sometimes considered synonymous with endomysium in the heart, but cardiac skeleton also refers to the combination of the endomysium and perimysium.

== Clinical significance ==
Anti-endomysial antibodies (EMA) are present in celiac disease. They do not cause any direct symptoms to muscles, but detection of EMA is useful in the diagnosis of the disease.

== See also ==
- Connective tissue in skeletal muscle
