= Epimysium =

Fibrous tissue envelope that surrounds muscle

- Structure of a skeletal muscle (epimysium labeled at bottom center)

Details
- Location: Muscle

Identifiers
- TA98: A04.0.00.041
- TA2: 2009
- TH: H3.03.00.0.00006
- FMA: 9726

Epimysium (plural epimysia) (Greek epi- for on, upon, or above + Greek mys for muscle) is the fibrous tissue envelope that surrounds skeletal muscle. It is a layer of dense irregular connective tissue which ensheaths the entire muscle and protects muscles from friction against other muscles and bones. It also allows a muscle to contract and move powerfully while maintaining its structural integrity.

It is continuous with fascia and other connective tissue wrappings of muscle including the endomysium and perimysium. It is also continuous with tendons, where it becomes thicker and collagenous.

While the epimysium is irregular on muscles, it is regular on tendons.

== Meat ==
In butchery and gastronomy, the epimysium is often called silverskin, and is thought of as a kind of gristle. It remains tough, chewy, and inedible when cooked, and is often trimmed away before cooking.
