= List of bad luck signs =

Bad luck is an unpredictable outcome that is unfortunate. This is a list of signs believed to bring bad luck according to superstitions.

== List ==
- Breaking a mirror is said to bring seven years of bad luck
- A bird or flock of birds going from left to right (Auspicia) (Paganism)
- Certain numbers:
  - The number 4. Fear of the number 4 is known as tetraphobia; in Chinese, Japanese, and Korean languages, the number sounds like the word for "death".
  - The number 9. Fear of the number 9 is known as enneaphobia, in Japanese culture; this is because it sounds like the Japanese word for "suffering".
  - The number 13. Fear of the number 13 is known as triskaidekaphobia.
  - The number 17. Fear of the number 17 is known as heptadecaphobia and is prominent in Italian culture.
  - The number 39. Fear of the number 39 is known as the curse of 39, especially in Afghan culture.
  - The number 43. In Japanese culture, maternity wards numbered 43 are considered taboo, as the word for the number means "stillbirth".
  - The number 666. Fear of the number 666 is known as hexakosioihexekontahexaphobia. Per Biblical prophecy, the "Number of The Beast", signifies the return of the Devil and Antichrist. Also called the "Mark of the Beast", wherein all humans who consent to have it on their forehead or hand will be eternally damned.
- Friday the 13th (in Spain, Greece, and Georgia: Tuesday the 13th)
- Failing to respond to a chain letter
- Giving a clock as a gift in Chinese culture, as in Chinese, to give a clock (Chinese: 送鐘/送钟; pinyin: sòng zhōng) has the same pronunciation as "sending off for one's end" (Chinese: 送終/送终; pinyin: sòngzhōng).
- Some believe hanging a horseshoe with the ends pointing down is bad luck, as it is believed that the luck will 'fall out' However, this is not universally considered unlucky. In some cultures and traditions, hanging a horseshoe with the ends pointing down is thought to shower good luck upon those passing beneath it. Additionally, some people personally believe that this orientation brings good fortune, regardless of cultural norms. Historically, blacksmiths—a trade long associated with luck and protection—often hung horseshoes upside down as a symbol of their craft. A superstitious blacksmith and apprentice believe that the luck from the horseshoe will flow toward him or her, their tools, and eventually to whatever project they are working on.
- Opening an umbrella while indoors
- On the Isle of Man, rats are referred to as "longtails" as saying "rat" is considered bad luck.
- Navajo culture:
  - pointing at a rainbow
  - throwing rocks into the wind
  - a coyote crossing one's path heading north
  - an owl flying over a house.
- Placing chopsticks straight up in a bowl of rice in Chinese and Japanese culture is reminiscent of food offerings left for the dead.
- Ravens, crows and magpies
- Saying the word "Macbeth" or wishing someone "Good Luck" while inside a theatre
  - The substitutions "The Scottish Play" and "Break a leg" are used instead.
- Shoes on a table
- Placing a hat on a bed
- Three on a match
- Tipping a salt shaker over
- Viewing one's doppelgänger may be considered a harbinger of bad luck
- Killing a ladybug
- Walking under a ladder
- Black cat crossing one's path
- Picking up a penny with the tails side up
- Making a favorable prediction or otherwise "tempting fate" without knocking on wood

== See also ==
- List of lucky symbols
- Bad luck (disambiguation)
- Theatrical superstitions
- Faux pas derived from Chinese pronunciation
- Sailors' superstitions#Bad luck
- Apotropaic magic
