= In bocca al lupo =

Italian expression of encouragement used in the performing arts

In bocca al lupo (pronounced [in ˈbokka al ˈluːpo]; lit. 'into the wolf's mouth') is an Italian idiom originally used in opera and theatre to wish a performer good luck prior to a performance.

The standard response is crepi il lupo! (IPA: [ˈkrɛːpi il ˈluːpo]; 'may the wolf die') or, more commonly, simply crepi! ('may it die').

Equivalent to the English actor's idiom break a leg, the expression reflects a theatrical superstition in which wishing a person good luck is considered bad luck. The expression is commonly used in Italy off stage, as superstitions and customs travel through other professions and then into common use, and it can sometimes be heard outside of Italy.

== Origin ==
Its use originated with hunters wishing each other to be in dangerous situations. The superstitious use of wishing a negative or dangerous situation as a way of wishing good luck is common in other languages. Indeed, the general image of the wolf in the common language, both in Italy and in the Western culture, is that of a dangerous, hungry and violent creature (e.g. wolf in sheep's clothing, cry wolf).

== Alternative idioms ==
A variation on in bocca al lupo is in culo alla balena, meaning 'into the whale's arse'. The correct response is speriamo che non caghi ('let's hope it doesn't shit').

An alternative operatic good luck charm is the phrase toi toi toi, originally an idiom used to ward off a spell or curse, often accompanied by knocking on wood, and onomatopoeic spitting (or imitating the sound of spitting). Amongst English actors break a leg is the usual phrase, while for professional dancers the traditional saying is merde, from French for 'shit'. In Spanish and Portuguese, the phrase is respectively mucha mierda and muita merda, or 'lots of shit'.

== In popular culture ==
The American band Murder by Death has an album titled In Bocca al Lupo.

The idiom is often used in the 2015 young adult book Ink and Bone by Rachel Caine.

== See also ==
- Spilling water for luck
