= List of Greek and Latin roots in English/H =

All Latin and Greek roots beginning with H

Lists of Greek and Latin roots in English beginning with other letters:
- A
- B
- C
- D
- E
- F
- G
- H
- I
- J
- K
- L
- M
- N
- O
- P
- Q
- R
- S
- T
- U
- V
- X
- Z

== H ==
Root	Meaning in English	Origin language	Etymology (root origin)	English examples
hab-, -hib-, habit-, -hibit-	have	Latin	habere "to have", habitus "habit", habitare "to live (reside)"	ability, able, debenture, debile, debilitate, debility, debit, debitor, debt, debtor, devoir, disability, disable, disenable, disinhibit, disinhibition, due, duty, enable, enablement, endeavor, exhibit, exhibition, exhibitor, habeas corpus, habendum, habenula, habile, habilitate, hability, habit, habitable, habitance, habitant, habitat, habitation, habitator, habitual, habituate, habituation, habitude, habitudinal, inability, indubitable, inhabile, inhabit, inhabitable, inhabitant, inhabitation, inhibit, inhibition, inhibitory, nonhabitual, prebend, prebendary, prohibit, prohibition, prohibitive, prohibitory, provender, rehabilitant, rehabilitate, rehabilitation, rehabilitative, rehabilitator
hadr-	thick	Greek	ἁδρός (hadrós)	Hadrocodium, Hadromys, hadron, Hadropithecus, hadrosaur, hadrosaurid
haem-, hem-	blood	Greek	αἷμα, αἵματος (haîma, haímatos)	anaemia, anemia, haematemesis, haematopoiesis, haematuria, haemochromatosis, haemophilia, haemophobia, haemoptysis, haemorrhage, haemorrhoid, haemosiderosis, haemostatic, hematocrit, hematogenesis, hematoma, hematophagous, hematophagy, hematopoiesis, hematopoietic, hematuria, hemocoel, hemocyte, hemoglobin, hemoglobinuria, hemophagy, hemophilia, hemophiliac, hemoptysis, hemorrhage, hemorrhagic, hemorrhea, hemorrhoid, hemorrhoidectomy, hemosiderin, hemosiderosis, hemostat, hemotherapy, hyperaemia, hyperemia, hyphaema, hyphema, methemoglobin, methemoglobinemia, microhematuria, microhemorrhage, polycythaemia
haere-	choose, take	Greek	αἱρεῖν (haireîn), αἱρεῖσθαι (haireîsthai), αἱρετός (hairetós), αἱρετικός (hairetikós), αἵρεσις (haíresis)	aphaeresis, diaeresis, heresiarch, heresy, heretic, plasmapheresis, synaeresis, syneresis
hal-	salt	Greek	ἅλς, ἁλός (háls, halós), ἅλινος (hálinos)	halide, halieutic, halite, halochromic, halochromism, halogen, halomancy, halophile, halophyte, oxohalide, thermohaline
hal-, -hel-	breathe	Latin	halare, halatus	anhelation, anhele, anhelous, exhalable, exhalant, exhalation, exhale, halitus, inhalable, inhalant, inhalation, inhale
hapl-	simple, single	Greek	ἁπλοῦς (haploûs), ἅπλωσις (háplōsis), ἅπλωμα (háplōma)	haplochromine, haplodiploid, haplodiploidy, haplography, haploid, haplology, haplont, haplontic, haplophase, haplopia, haplosis, haplotype
haur-, haust-	draw	Latin	haurire, haustus	exhaust, exhaustible, exhaustion, exhaustive, hauriant, haurient, haustellate, haustellum, haustorium, haustrum, inexhaustible, nonexhaustive
heb-	youth	Greek	ἥβη (hḗbē), ἡβητικός (hēbētikós), ἔφηβος (éphēbos), ἡβᾶν (hēbân), ἡβάσκω, ἡβητής (hēbētḗs)	ephebeum, ephebia, ephebiatrics, ephebic, ephebiphobia, ephebophilia, ephebos, hebephilia, hebephobia, hebephrenia, hebetic, hebiatrics, hebophile, hebophilia
hed- (ΕΔ)	sit	Greek	ἕδος, ἕδεος (hédos, hédeos), ἕδρα (hédra), ἕζεσθαι (hézesthai)	cathedra, chair, dodecahedron, dodecahemidodecahedron, endohedric, ephedra, exedra, hemipolyhedron, hexahedron, octahedron, pentahedroid, pentahedron, polyhedron, pyritohedron, rhombohedron, sanhedrin, synedrion, tetrahedroid, trapezohedron, trisoctahedron
hed-	pleasant, sweet	Greek	ἥδεσθαι, ἡδόμενον, ἡδύς (hēdómenon, hēdús), ἡδύτης, σϝηδύς, ἡδονή (hēdonḗ)	anhedonia, anhedonic, hedonics, hedonism, hedonist, hedonistic, hedonology, hyphedonia
heg-	lead	Greek	ἄγω, ἡγεῖσθαι (hēgeîsthai), ἡγούμενος (hēgoúmenos), ἡγεμών (hēgemṓn), ἡγεμονία, ἡγεμονικός	diegesis, diegetic, eisegesis, exegesis, exegete, exegetic, hegemon, hegemonic, hegemony, hegumen, hypodiegetic, metadiegetic, protohegumen
heli-	sun	Greek	ἥλιος (hḗlios)	aphelion, heliocentric, heliocentrism, heliodor, heliograph, heliolatry, heliomania, heliometer, heliopause, Heliophila, heliophobia, heliophyte, Helios, helioscope, heliosphere, heliostat, heliotherapy, heliotrope, heliotropic, heliotropism, helium, parhelion, perihelion
helic-	something twisted or spiral	Greek	ϝελίσσω, ἑλίσσειν (helíssein), ἕλιξ, ἕλικος (hélix, hélikos), ἕλιξις, ἕλιγμα (hélixis, héligma), (helikoeidḗs)	anthelix, antihelix, helicine, helicograph, helicoid, helicopter, helicospore, helix
Hell-	Greece, Hellas	Greek	Ἑλλάς, ἑλλάδος (Hellás, helládos)	Helladic, Hellenic, Hellenism, Hellenistic
helminth-	worm	Greek	ἕλμινς, ἕλμινθος (hélmins, hélminthos)	anthelmintic, antihelminthic, helminth, helminthic, helminthoid
helot-	enslaved	Greek	Εἵλως, Εἵλωτος, Εἱλώτης	Helot, helotism, helotry
hemer-	day	Greek	ἡμέρα (hēméra)	Decameron, ephemeral, ephemeris, ephemeron, ephemerous, hemeralopia
hemer-	tame	Greek	ἥμερος (hḗmeros), ἡμερότης (hēmerótēs)	hemeroby, hemerochora, hemerophile
hemi-	half	Greek	ἥμισυς (hḗmisus)	anhemitonic, hemiballismus, hemicryptophyte, hemicube, hemicycle, hemidesmosome, hemimelia, hemimetabolic, hemimetabolism, hemimetaboly, hemiparesis, hemiplegia, hemipolyhedron, hemisphere, hemitonic
hen-	one	Greek	ἕν (hén), ἑνάς, ἑνάδος (henás, henádos), ἕνωσις (hénōsis)	enosis, enotikon, henad, hendiadys, henotheism, hyphen
hendec-	eleven	Greek	ἕνδεκα (héndeka)	hendecagon, hendecagram, hendecagrammic, hendecane, hendecasyllabic, hendecasyllable hendecahedron
hepat-	liver	Greek	ἧπαρ, ἥπατος (hêpar, hḗpatos), ἡπατικός (hēpatikós)	heparin, hepatic, hepatitis, hepatocyte, hepatology, hepatomancy, hepatoscopy, hepatotoxic, hepatotoxin, hepatotropic
hept-	seven	Greek	ἑπτά (heptá)	heptachord, heptagon, heptagram, heptagraph, heptahedron, heptamer, heptameric, heptameter, Heptateuch, heptathlete, heptathlon, heptatonic, heptode
her-, heir-	heir	Latin	heres (genitive heredis)	heir, heiress, hereditary, heredity, heritage, inherit
here-, hes-	cling, stick	Latin	haerere, haesus	adhere, adherence, adherend, adherent, adhesion, adhesive, cohere, coherence, coherent, cohesion, cohesive, decoherence, hesitancy, hesitant, hesitate, hesitation, hesitator, incoherent, inhere, inherency, inherent, inhesion, nonadherence, nonadherent, nonadhesive
herald-	messenger, envoy	Latin	heraldus	herald, heraldic, heraldry
herb-	grass	Latin	herba	herbal, herbicide, herbivore
heres-, heret-	choose, take	Greek	αἱρεῖν (haireîn) "to take, choose"	heresy, heretic, heretical
herm-	Hermes	Greek	Ἑρμῆς (Hermês)	herm, hermaphrodite, hermetic
hermeneu-	interpret, explain	Greek	ἑρμηνεύς (hermēneús), ἑρμηνεύω (hermēneúō), ἑρμηνευτικός (hermēneutikós), ἑρμήνευσις, ἑρμήνευμα	hermeneutic, hermeneutics
hero-	hero	Greek	ἥρως, ἥρωος (hḗrōs, hḗrōos), ἡρωίνη (hērōínē), ἡρωϊκός (hērōïkós), ἡρωϊσμός (hērōïsmós)	antihero, hero, heroic, heroine, heroism
herp-	creep	Greek	ἕρπειν (hérpein), ἕρπης, ἕρπητος (hérpēs, hérpētos)	herpes, herpetology
heter-	different, other	Greek	ἕτερος (héteros)	heterochromatin, heterodox, heterodoxy, heterogeneity, heterogeneous, heterophobia, heterosexuality, heterosexual, heterosis, heterotic
heur-	find	Greek	εὑρίσκειν (heurískein), εὕρηκα (heúrēka), εὕρημα (heúrēma)	eureka, heuristic, metaheuristic
hex-	six	Greek	ἕξ (héx), ἑξάς, ἑξάδος (hexás, hexádos)	hexachord, hexad, hexadic, hexagon, hexagram, hexahedron, hexamer, hexamerous, hexameter, hexapod, hexastyle, hexasyllabic, Hexateuch, hexatonic, hexode, tetrahemihexahedron
hi-	gape	Latin	hiare	dehisce, dehiscence, dehiscent, hiatal, hiatus, indehiscence, indehiscent, inhiation
hibern-	wintry	Latin	hibernus	hibernacle, hibernaculum, hibernal, hibernate, hibernation, hibernator
hidrot-	sweat	Greek	ἱδρώς, ἱδρῶτος (hidrṓs, hidrōtos), ἱδροῦν (hidroûn), ἵδρωσις (hídrōsis)	anhidrosis, dyshidrosis, dyshidrotic, hematidrosis, hidrocystoma, hidropoiesis, hidroschesis, hidrosis, hidrotic, hyperhidrosis, hypohidrosis
hiem-	winter	Latin	hiems	hiemal
hier-	holy, sacred	Greek	ἱερός (hierós)	hierarch, hierarchy, hieratic, hierocracy, hierodeacon, hieroglyph, hieroglyphic, hierogram, hierolatry, hieromonk, hierurgy
hipp-	horse	Greek	ἵππος (híppos)	ephippium, hippeis, hippocampus, hippodrome, hippology, Hippolyte, hippomancy, hippophagy, hippophile, hippophobia, hippopotamus, parahippocampus
hirsut-	hairy	Latin	hirtus, hirsutus	hirsute, hirsutulous
hispid-	bristly	Latin	hispidus	hispidity, hispidulous
histri-	actor	Latin	histrio, histrionis	histrionic
hod-	way	Greek	ὁδός (hodós)	anode, cathode, diode, electrode, episode, ergodic, exodos, exodus, heptode, herpolhode, hodograph, hodology, hodometer, hodonym, hodophobia, hodoscope, hydathode, method, methodic, Methodism, Methodist, methodology, octode, parodos, pentode, period, periodic, synod, tetrode, triode
hol-	whole	Greek	ὅλος (hólos), ὁλικός (holikós)	catholic, holiatry, holism, holistic, holography, holomorphic, holonomy
hom-	same	Greek	ὁμός (homós)	homiletic, homily, homogeneous, homograph, homologous, homology, homomorphism, homonym, homophobia, homophone, homosexual, homozygous
homal-	even, flat	Greek	ὁμαλός (homalós) "even", from ὁμός (homós) "same"	anomalous, anomaly
homin-	human	Latin	homo, hominis	ad hominem, bonhomie, homage, hombre, homicide, hominid, homuncular, homunculus, human, humane, humanitarian, humanity, inhuman, inhumane, inhumanity, Nemo, nonhuman, omber, ombre, prehuman, subhuman, superhuman, transhuman
homoe-, home-	like, similar	Greek	ὅμοιος (hómoios), ὁμοῖος, ὁμοιότης	homeomorphism, homeopathy, homeostasis, homeothermy, homoeopathy, homoiotherm, homoiothermic
honor-	esteem	Latin	honos, honoris	dishonor, dishonorable, honorable, honorand, honorarium, honorary, honoree, honorific
hor-	boundary	Greek	ὅρος (hóros), ὁρίζειν (horízein)	aorist, aphorism, aphorismus, aphorize, diorite, horizon, horopter, horotelic
hor-	hour	Greek	ὥρα (hṓra)	horologist, horology, horometry, horoscope
horm-	that which excites	Greek	ὁρμᾶν, ὁρμεῖν (hormân, hormeîn), ὁρμή (hormḗ), ὅρμησις (hórmēsis), ὁρμῶν (hormôn)	horme, hormephobia, hormesis, hormetic, hormic, hormone
hort-	garden	Latin	hortus, horti	antecourt, cohort, cortege, court, courteous, courtesan, courtesy, courtier, curtain, curtilage, Curtis, discourteous, discourtesy, frontcourt, horticultural, horticulture
hospit-	host	Latin	hospes, hospitis	co-host, hospice, hospitable, hospital, hospitality, host, hostal, hostel, hosteler, hostler, hotel, hotelier, inhospitable, inhospitality
host-	enemy	Latin	hostis	host, hostile, hostility
hum-	ground	Latin	humus, humare	disinhume, exhumation, exhume, humate, humation, humble, humic, humicolous, humiliate, humiliation, humility, humus, inhumation, inhume
hyal-	glass	Greek	ὕαλος (húalos)	hyaline, hyaloid
hybr-	wantonness	Greek	ὕβρις (húbris), ὑβρίζω, ὕβριστος, ὑβριστικός (hubrízō, húbristos, hubristikós), ὑβρισμός, ὕβρισμα, ὑβριστής	hubris, hubristic, hybris, hybristic
hydn-	truffle	Greek	ὕδνον (húdnon)	hydnoid, Hydnum
hydr-	water	Greek	ὕδωρ, ὕδατος (húdōr, húdatos), ὕδρα (húdra)	clepsydra, dehydrate, hydathode, hydatid, hydatidosis, hydra, hydrant, hydrate, hydraulic, hydraulics, hydrochloric, hydrodynamics, hydroelectric, hydrogen, hydrologist, hydrology, hydrolysis, hydromancy, hydrophile, hydrophilic, hydrophily, hydrophobia, hydrophobic, hydroponic, hydrosphere, hydrostat, hydrostatic, hydrothermic, hydrous, hydrozoa, polyhydric
hygie-	healthy	Greek	ὑγιής (hugiḗs), ὑγίεια (hugíeia), ὑγιεινός (hugieinós), ὑγιάζειν	Hygieia, hygiene, hygienic, hygienics, hygienist
hygr-	wet	Greek	ὑγρός (hugrós)	hygric, hygroma, hygrometer
hymen-	skin or membrane	Greek	ὑμήν, ὑμένος (humḗn, huménos)	hymen, hymenium, hymenomycete, hymenophore, hymenoplasty, Hymenoptera, hymenorrhaphy, hymenotomy
hyo-	U-shaped	Greek	ὑοειδής (huoeidḗs)	hyoid, hyostyly
hyp-, hypo-	under, below	Greek	ὑπό (hupó)	hyphen, hypoallergenic, hypodermic, hypogene, hypothermia, hypothesis, hypotonic, hypoxemia, hypoxia
hyper-	above, over	Greek	ὑπέρ (hupér)	hyper, hyperbaric, hyperbola, hyperbole, Hyperion, hyperlink, hyperoxia, hyperpyrexia, hyperthermia, hypertonic
hyph-	weave	Greek	ὑφαίνειν (huphaínein), ὕφασμα, ὑφή (huphḗ) "web"	hypha, hyphomycete, hyphopodium
hypn-	sleep	Greek	ὕπνος (húpnos)	hypnagogia, hypnagogic, hypnolepsy, hypnophobia, hypnopompia, hypnopompic, hypnosis, hypnotherapy, hypnotic, hypnotist, hypnotize
hyps-	height	Greek	ὕψι, ὕψιστος, ὕψος (húpsos), ὑψοῦ, ὑψόθεν	hypsography, hypsometer, hypsophobia
hys-	hog	Greek	ὗς (hûs), ὕαινα (húaina)	hyena, hyenoid
hyster-	womb	Greek	ὑστέρα (hustéra)	hysteralgia, hysteratresia, hysterectomy, hysteria, hysteric, hysterosalpingography
hyster-	later	Greek	ὑστερεῖν (hustereîn), ὕστερος (hústeros), ὑστέρησις (hustérēsis), ὑστέρημα (hustérēma)	hysteresis, hysteretic, hysteron proteron
