= Theatrical superstitions =

Superstitions particular to actors or the theatre

Theatrical superstitions are superstitions particular to actors or the theatre.

== Macbeth ==
William Shakespeare's play Macbeth is said to be cursed, so actors avoid saying its name when in the theatre (the euphemism "The Scottish Play" is used instead). Actors also avoid even quoting the lines from Macbeth before performances, particularly the Witches' incantations. Outside a theatre and after a performance, the play can be spoken of openly. If an actor speaks the word "Macbeth", or quotes the play, in a theatre other than in performance, they must perform a ritual to remove the curse. The ritual may vary according to local custom: one is to leave the theatre building or at least the room occupied when the name was mentioned, spin around three times, spit, curse, and then knock to be allowed back in. This particular iteration of the ritual is documented in the play The Dresser and its screen adaptations.

One version of this legend claims that it was the actress who played Lady Macbeth who died during the play's first production run and that Shakespeare himself had to assume the role. There is no evidence that this legend is factual.

== "Break a leg" vs. "Good luck" ==
In American theatre industry, it is considered bad luck to wish someone "good luck" in a theatre. Prior to performances, it is traditional for the cast to gather together to avert the bad luck by wishing each other bad luck or cursing, the expression "break a leg" replaces the phrase "good luck". The exact origin of this expression is unknown, but some of the most popular theories are the Leg Line Theory (also known as the Curtain Theory), the Shakespearean Theory (also sometimes referred to as the Traditional Theory), and the Bowing Theory.

In Australian theatrical circles saying "good luck" is also avoided, but the replacement is often "chookas!" This may be due to the belief among some dancers that saying "break a leg" may actually result in broken bones. According to one oral tradition, one of the company would check audience numbers. If there were not many in the seats, the performers would have bread to eat following the performance. If the theatre was full they could then have "chook" —Australian slang for chicken— for dinner. Therefore, if it was a full house, the performer would call out "Chook it is!", which became abbreviated to "Chookas!" It is now used by performers prior to a show regardless of the number of patrons; and may be a wish for a successful turnout.

Professional dancers do not wish each other good luck by saying "break a leg"; instead they say "Merde!", the French word for "shit". In turn, theater people have picked up this usage and may wish each other "merde", alone or in combination with "break a leg". In Spanish, the phrase is "mucha mierda", or "lots of shit". This term refers to the times when carriages would take the audience to the theatre. A quick look to the street in front of the venue would tell if the play was successful: a lot of horse dung on the floor indicated that many carriages had stopped to allow spectators to the theatre to alight.

Opera singers use "Toi toi toi", an idiom used to ward off a spell or hex, often accompanied by knocking on wood. One explanation sees "toi toi toi" as the onomatopoeic rendition of spitting three times. Saliva traditionally was supposed to have demon-banishing powers and, in various cultural traditions, spitting three times over someone's head or shoulder is a gesture to ward off evil spirits. A similar-sounding expression for verbal spitting occurs in modern Hebrew as "Tfu, tfu" (here, only twice), which some say that Hebrew-speakers borrowed from Russian.

An alternate operatic good luck charm, originating from Italy, is the phrase "in bocca al lupo!" ("In the mouth of the wolf") with the response "Crepi il lupo!" ("May the wolf die").

== Ghost light ==
One should always leave a light burning in an empty theatre.

Though it is a superstition, it does have practical value as well: the backstage area of a theatre tends to be cluttered with props and other objects, so someone who enters a completely darkened space is liable to be injured while hunting for a light switch. It is also said that a ghost light can guide the theatre spirits said to be haunting every theatre.

== Ghosts in Broadway theatres ==
In 2005, Playbill ran an article about Broadway theatres that were believed to be haunted. The following is a list of hauntings from that article:

- Radio City Music Hall: The Hall's builder, Samuel Roxy Rothafel, is said to appear on opening nights accompanied by a glamorous woman spirit.
- New Amsterdam Theatre: Silent film star and former Ziegfeld Follies girl Olive Thomas is said to have appeared several times since her death in 1920. Thomas may be the most sighted ghost on Broadway, although to date she has only appeared to men. Disney, which restored the theatre in the 1990s, actively promotes the idea that Thomas haunts the theatre and makes accommodations for her presence. A large photograph of her hangs in the lobby of the New Amsterdam next to equally large photos of more famous Follies stars.
- Belasco Theatre: The top floor of the theatre is said to be haunted by its namesake David Belasco, who lived in an apartment located there.
- Palace Theatre: The former premiere vaudeville theatre is said to be haunted by more than 100 ghosts. According to the article, actress Andrea McArdle saw the ghost of a pit cellist during her 1999–2000 run as Belle in Beauty and the Beast.
- Lyric Theatre: On December 21, 1909, the ghost of playwright Clyde Fitch allegedly appeared onstage during the final curtain call on opening night for his last play, The City. He strode to center stage, took a bow, then vanished before the eyes of the startled cast and audience. (Fitch had died on September 4 of that year.) The Lyric was one of two theatres demolished in 1996 to make way for The Ford Center, which is now called the Lyric Theatre.
- Al Hirschfeld Theatre: Formerly the Martin Beck Theatre, it is believed that Beck's ghost is annoyed with the 2003 name change. During that year's revival of Wonderful Town, there were several reports of props and other items that were mysteriously moved or went missing.

== Whistling ==
Related to a similar rule for sailing ships, it is considered bad luck for an actor to whistle on or off stage. As original stage crews were hired from ships in port (theatrical rigging has its origins in sailing rigging), sailors, and by extension theatrical riggers, used coded whistles to cue scene changes. Actors who whistled could confuse them into changing the set or scenery at the wrong time and this could result in injury or death, especially if they were flying set or backdrops in or out. In today's theatres, the stage crew normally uses an intercom or cue light system.

== Shoes on a table ==
It is considered bad luck to place one's shoes on a table.

== Miscellaneous ==
- "Bad dress rehearsal, good performance."
- Specific theatres
  - Some Broadway producers have also complained about the Lyric Theatre (formerly known as the "Hilton Theatre," "Ford Center for the Performing Arts" and the "Foxwoods Theatre"). Completed in 1998, the main complaint is that the 1829-seat theatre's cavernous auditorium has poor sightlines and acoustics, making it difficult for audience members in distant seats to see or hear the actors. Mel Brooks (whose Young Frankenstein ran for 14 months there) made a different complaint about the theatre's acoustics, stating that its size also makes it difficult for performers to hear the laughter of the audience. The theatre opened with the two-year, 834 performance run of the original production of the musical Ragtime. This was followed in 2001 by the four-year, 1524 performance run of the revival of the musical 42nd Street. Normally, this would have given the theatre a good reputation, but its poor reputation grew exponentially in 2010–11 with the seemingly endless production problems of Spider-Man: Turn Off the Dark, which had already set the record for most preview performances five months before it officially opened on 14 June 2011. See also the Lyric Theatre under "Ghosts of Broadway Theatres" above.
  - Before My Fair Lady began its six-year, 2,017 performance run at the Mark Hellinger Theatre in 1956, that theatre was thought to be cursed. It had been switched back and forth several times between being a motion picture theatre and a live stage theatre. From its opening in 1930 until the opening of My Fair Lady, the 1949 musical Texas, Li'l Darlin' had the longest run at the Hellinger—nine months and 293 performances.

== See also ==
- Sailors' superstitions
