= Toi toi toi =

Expression of encouragement used in the performing arts

"Toi toi toi" (English: /ˈtɔɪ ˈtɔɪ ˈtɔɪ/) is an expression used in the performing arts to wish an artist success in an imminent performance. It is similar to "break a leg" and reflects a superstition that wishing someone "good luck" is in fact bad luck.

== Origin ==
There are many theories as to the origin of Toi toi toi as an idiom. In folklore it was used to ward off a spell or hex, often accompanied by knocking on wood or spitting. One origin theory sees toi toi toi as the onomatopoetic rendition of spitting three times, a common practice in many parts of the world to ward off evil spirits. Saliva traditionally had demon-banishing powers. Another theory claims the origin to be a threefold warning of the devil (Teufel, pronounced [/ˈtɔʏfl̩/] in German).

Also from Rotwelsch tof and from Yiddish tov ('good', derived from the Hebrew טוב and with phonetic similarities to the Old German tiuvel 'devil').

== Similar expressions ==
An alternate operatic good luck charm originating from Italy is the phrase In bocca al lupo! (In the mouth of the wolf) with the response Crepi! or Crepi il lupo! (May it [the wolf] die!). Amongst actors "Break a leg" is the usual phrase, while for professional dancers the traditional saying is merde (French, meaning "shit"). In Spanish, the phrase is mucha mierda, or "lots of shit", as in Portuguese ("muita merda").

== See also ==
- Knocking on wood
- Spilling water for luck
