= Break a leg =

English idiom used in theatre to wish a performer good luck

"Break a leg" is an English-language idiom used in the context of theatre or other performing arts to wish a performer "good luck". An ironic or non-literal saying of uncertain origin (a dead metaphor), "break a leg" is commonly said to actors and musicians before they go on stage to perform or before an audition. Though a similar and potentially related term seems to have first existed in German without theatrical associations, the English theatre expression with its luck-based meaning is first attributed in the 1930s or possibly 1920s.

== Origins ==
=== Superstition theories ===
There is anecdotal evidence of this expression from theatrical memoirs and personal letters as early as the 1920s. The urbane Irish nationalist Robert Wilson Lynd published an article, "A Defence of Superstition", in the October 1921 edition of the New Statesman, a British liberal political and cultural magazine, that provides one of the earliest mentions of this usage in English:

The stage is perhaps the most superstitious institution in England, after the racecourse. The latter is so superstitious that to wish a man luck when on his way to a racemeeting is considered unlucky. Instead of saying "Good luck!" you should say something insulting, such as, "May you break your leg!"

Thus, Lynd describes the expression as existing in horse racing, though in the very middle of a paragraph that goes on to discuss the theatre and theatrical superstitions.

Perhaps the earliest published example directly in a theatre context comes from the American writer Edna Ferber's 1939 autobiography A Peculiar Treasure, in which she writes about the theatre and "all the understudies sitting in the back row politely wishing the various principals would break a leg".

The American playwright Bernard Sobel's 1948 The Theatre Handbook and Digest of Plays describes the theatrical superstition that "before a performance actors never wish each other good luck, but say 'I hope you break a leg.'" There are certainly several publications by the 1950s that explain the expression's theatrical meaning. Sources from then onwards contend that the expression reflects a superstition that directly wishing a performer "good luck" would be considered bad luck or an unintentional jinxing, therefore an alternative, ironic, or opposite-sounding way of wishing luck emerged. The exact reason why the expression focuses on a bone fracture or a leg, however, remains uncertain.

=== German aviation theory ===
A phrase with a similar meaning appears in the German language by World War I or, at the latest, World War II, during the early days of aviation: Hals- und Beinbruch, literally "neck and leg(bone) break" or, essentially, "may you break your neck and leg". For example, Luftwaffe pilots are reported as using the phrase Hals- und Beinbruch to wish each other luck.

The origin of the German phrase is also mysterious, possibly a pun or borrowing from the Yiddish theatre. Yiddish contains a phonetically similar phrase that more literally wishes the listener good luck (Yiddish: הצלחה און ברכה, romanized: hatsloche un broche, lit. 'success and blessing', itself from Hebrew: hatzlacha u-bracha).

If the German expression is indeed related to the English one, a proposed progression is that the phrase transferred from German aviation to German society at large and then, as early as the 1920s but certainly the 1930s, into the American (or British and then American) theatre. The English-language adoption of this term is plausibly explained by German-speaking Jewish immigrants entering the American entertainment industry after the First World War.

=== Other suggested but implausible theories ===
The performer bowing: The term "break a leg" may refer to a performer bowing or curtsying to the audience in the metaphorical sense of bending one's leg to do so.

The performer breaking the leg line: The edge of a stage just beyond the vantage point of the audience forms a line, imaginary or actually marked, that can be referred to as the "leg line", named after a type of concealing stage curtain: a leg. For an unpaid stand-by performer to cross or "break" this line would mean that the performer was getting an opportunity to go onstage and be paid; therefore, "break a leg" might have shifted from a specific hope for this outcome to a general hope for any performer's good fortune. Even less plausible, the saying could originally express the hope that an enthusiastic audience repeatedly calls for further bows or encores. This might cause a performer to repeatedly "break" the leg line, or, alternatively, it might even cause the leg curtains themselves to break from overuse.

Allusion to David Garrick: During a performance of Shakespeare's Richard III, the famed 18th-century British actor David Garrick became so entranced in the performance that he was supposedly unaware of a literal fracture in his leg.

Audience chair legs: Various folk-theories propose that Elizabethan or even Ancient Greek theatrical audiences either stomped their literal legs or banged chair legs to express applause.

Allusion to John Wilkes Booth: One popular etymology derives the phrase from the 1865 assassination of Abraham Lincoln, during which John Wilkes Booth, the actor-turned-assassin, claimed in his diary that he broke his leg leaping to the stage of Ford's Theatre after murdering the president. The fact that actors did not start wishing each other to "break a leg" until as early as the 1920s (more than 50 years later) makes this an unlikely source.

Booth often exaggerated and falsified his diary entries to make them more dramatic, though there are several witnesses from the crowded Ford's Theatre that evening that confirm he broke his leg, as well as historical reference that Dr. Samuel Mudd, who was later arrested for helping Booth which confirm that Booth actually broke his leg. However, it is very unlikely this event was the source of the good luck wish, "break a leg".

The leg used to open the curtains The term is also said to refer to the leg used to wind the tabs (the curtains) in the theatre. If you had a successful performance you were given many curtain calls. The term "break a leg" is said to mean break the leg of the curtain crank meaning your performance was so good they had to keep opening and shutting the curtains at the end during the curtain call (bows) that the leg would break from overuse.

== Alternative meanings ==
There is an older, likely unrelated meaning of "break a leg" going back to the 17th and 18th centuries that refers to having "a bastard / natural child".

== Alternative terms ==
Professional dancers do not wish each other good luck by saying "break a leg"; instead they exclaim merde, the French word for "shit". In turn, theater people have picked up this usage and may wish each other merde alone or in combination with "break a leg". In Spanish and Portuguese, the phrase is mucha mierda and muita merda respectively, or "lots of shit". This term refers to the times when carriages would take the audience to the theatre; a quick look to the street in front of the venue would tell if the play was successful: a lot of horse dung would mean many carriages had stopped to drop off spectators.

Opera singers use Toi toi toi, an idiom used to ward off a spell or hex, often accompanied by knocking on wood, and onomatopoeic, spitting (or imitating the sound of spitting). Saliva traditionally was supposed to have demon-banishing powers. From Rotwelsch tof, from Yiddish tov ("good", derived from the Hebrew טוב and with phonetic similarities to the Old German word for "Devil"). One explanation sees "toi toi toi" as the onomatopoeic rendition of spitting three times. Spitting three times over someone's head or shoulder is a gesture to ward off evil spirits. A similar-sounding expression for verbal spitting occurs in modern Hebrew as "Tfu, tfu" (here, only twice), which some say that Hebrew-speakers borrowed from Russian.

An alternate operatic good luck charm, originating from Italy, is the phrase In bocca al lupo! (In the mouth of the wolf) with the response Crepi il lupo! (May the wolf die).

In Australia, the term 'chookas' has been used also. According to one oral tradition, one of the company would check audience numbers. If there were not many in the seats, the performers would have bread to eat following the performance. If the theatre was full they could then have "chook" —Australian slang for chicken— for dinner. Therefore, if it was a full house, the performer would call out "Chook it is!", which became abbreviated to "Chookas!" It is now used by performers prior to a show regardless of the number of patrons; and may be a wish for a successful turnout.

In Russian, a similar tradition existed for hunters, with one being told Ни пуха, ни пера! (romanized: Ni pukha, ni pera, "Neither fur nor feather") before the hunt, with the reply being К чёрту (romanized: K chiortu, "Go to hell"). Today, this exchange is customary for students before an exam.

== In popular culture ==
Both the 2001 Broadway musical comedy The Producers as well as the 2005 film version of the musical features a song titled "It's Bad Luck To Say 'Good Luck' On Opening Night", in which the novice producer Leo Bloom is instructed that the proper way to wish someone good luck on Broadway is to say "Break a leg". Moments later, the show's star is seen to break his leg—preventing him from performing—and in a later scene he breaks his other leg.

== See also ==
- Knocking on wood
- Spilling water for luck
- The Scottish Play
- Thespis
