= Long tail (disambiguation) =

Long tail is a consumer demographic in business.

Long tail or longtail may also refer to:

== Science ==
- Long-tail distribution, a probability distribution that assigns relatively high probabilities to regions far from the mean or median
- The Long Tail (book), a popular book about the effect of Long Tail on the web media
- Power law's long tail, a statistics term describing certain kinds of distribution
- Long-tail traffic, telecommunication traffic that exhibits a long-tail distribution

== Technology and business ==
- Long-tail boat, a type of watercraft native to Southeast Asia
- Longtail (bicycle), a two-wheeled rear-loading freight bicycle, with a longer than usual frame wheelbase
- Longtail Studios, Canadian video game company
- Langheck (longtail), variants of the Porsche 907, Porsche 908 and Porsche 917

== Animals ==
- Longtail (rat), euphemism used to denote a rat on the Isle of Man
- Longtail tuna, a species of tuna of tropical Indo-West Pacific waters
- Long-tailed macaque, also called the crab-eating macaque
- White-tailed tropicbird, or longtail in Bermuda, a type of bird

== See also ==
- Skewness
