= The Scottish Play (Graham Holliday play) =

Play by Graham Holliday

The Scottish Play: A Play is a play written by Graham Holliday, and published by Samuel French.

== Synopsis ==
The play features Michael, one of the better actors in a fictional amateur theatre society, The Shellsfoot Thespians, who dreams of directing William Shakespeare's Macbeth, which is known in the real theatrical world as "The Scottish Play". Real theatrical custom has it to not refer to the play by its real name, due to a mythical curse. When his wife and his best friend are cast in the leading parts, Michael begins to wonder if this is due by his stubborn desire to direct at all costs, or by the curse associated with the play. Despite problems, he has separated his personal life from his professional life, and a lack of support from all but the set designer and technician, he continues with the production.
