= Shoes on a table =

Superstition

There is a superstition that bad luck will come to a person who places shoes on a table.

A belief common in the North of England is that the tradition relates to the coal mining industry. When a worker died in a mining accident, his shoes were placed on the table as a sign of respect. By extension, doing so was seen as tempting fate or simply as bad taste.

In the world of theatre, putting shoes on a dressing room table is considered by some to bring the risk of a bad performance, just as "Break a leg!" is considered good luck. Also described as an old wives' tale, the superstition may date back to medieval times. Some sources ascribe the origin to the fact that criminals were hanged while still wearing their shoes. It may have something to do with death, and the idea of placing a new pair of shoes on the table would signify that someone had just died, or you would have bad luck for the rest of the day, quarrel with someone, or lose your job.

Even among people who are not superstitious, shoes can be associated with contamination.

== See also ==
- Removal of footwear indoors
