= Faux pas derived from Chinese pronunciation =

Chinese homophones leading to awkward sayings

The following faux pas are derived from homonyms in Mandarin and Cantonese. While originating in Greater China, they may also apply to Chinese-speaking people around the world. However, most homonymic pairs listed work only in some varieties of Chinese (for example, Mandarin only or Cantonese only), and may appear bewildering even to speakers of other varieties of Chinese.

Certain customs regarding good and bad luck are important to many Chinese people. Although these might be regarded as superstitions by people from other cultures, these customs are often tied to religious traditions and are an important part of many people's belief systems, even among well-educated people and affluent sectors of society.

== Clocks ==
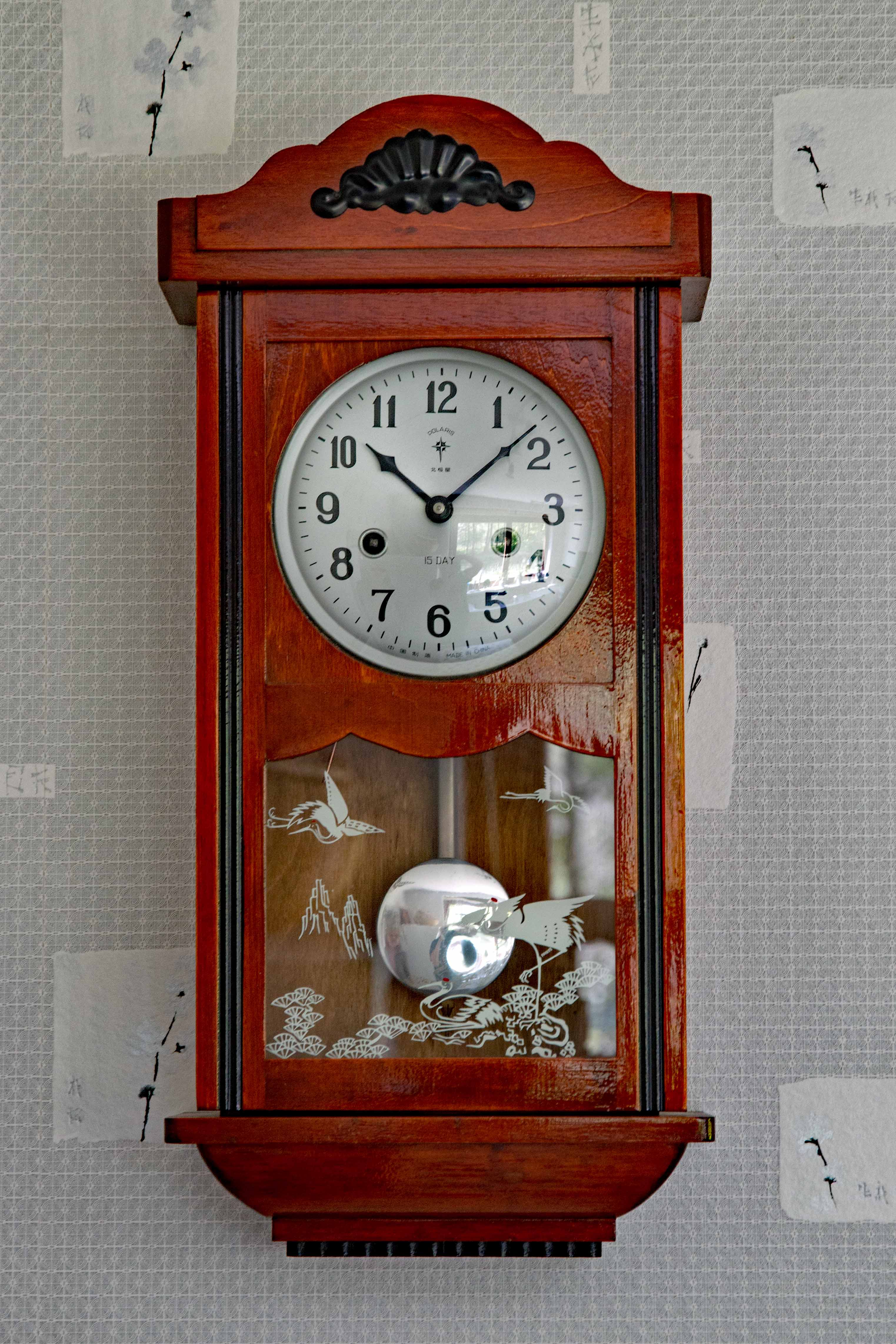
Chinese wall clock

Giving a clock (Chinese: 送鐘/送钟; pinyin: sòng zhōng) is often taboo, especially to the elderly as the term for this act is a homophone with the term for the act of attending another's funeral, "to send off for one's end" (Chinese: 送終/送终; pinyin: sòngzhōng). In 2015, a UK government official, Susan Kramer, gave a watch to Taipei Mayor Ko Wen-je and was unaware of the taboo, which resulted in some professional embarrassment and a pursuant apology. Cantonese people consider such a gift as a curse.

This homonymic pair works in nearly all varieties of Chinese, as the words for 'clock' and 'end' came to be pronounced identically very early in mainstream Chinese varieties, by around the 11th century. That being said, this taboo does not apply to smaller items such as watches, as they are not called zhōng in most parts of China, unlike clocks and large bells. Watches are commonly given as gifts in China.

However, should such a gift be given, the "unluckiness" of the gift can be countered by exacting a small monetary payment so that the recipient is buying the clock and thereby counteracting the '送' ("to gift") expression of the phrase.

== Fans and umbrellas ==
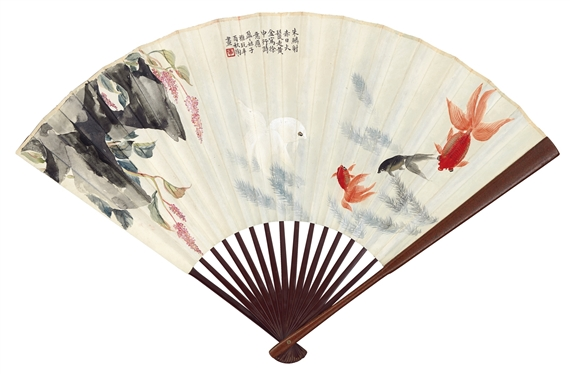
A hand fan

It is undesirable to give someone a fan or an umbrella as a gift. The words for 'fan' (Chinese: 扇; pinyin: shàn) and 'umbrella' (simplified Chinese: 伞; traditional Chinese: 傘; pinyin: sǎn) sound like the word sǎn/sàn (散), meaning to scatter, or to part company, to separate, to break up with someone, to split.

These homonymic pairs work in Mandarin and Cantonese. Cantonese has a more idiomatic term for umbrellas (ze1 in Cantonese, 遮) to avoid precisely this association.

== Books ==
As a book (simplified Chinese: 书; traditional Chinese: 書; pinyin: shū) is a homophone of "loss, to lose" (simplified Chinese: 输; traditional Chinese: 輸; pinyin: shū) in many areas, carrying or looking at a book (simplified Chinese: 带书, 看书; traditional Chinese: 帶書, 看書; pinyin: dài shū, kàn shū) where people are taking a risk, such as gambling or investing in stocks, may be considered to invite bad luck and loss (simplified Chinese: 带输, 看输; traditional Chinese: 帶輸, 看輸; pinyin: dài shū, kàn shū). This bad luck does not apply to carrying or reading newspapers (simplified Chinese: 带报, 看报; traditional Chinese: 帶報, 看報; pinyin: dàibào, kànbào) as newspapers (simplified Chinese: 报纸; traditional Chinese: 報紙; pinyin: bàozhǐ) are not books.

This homonymic pair works in Cantonese and Mandarin, with the avoidance particularly common in Cantonese-speaking areas.

== See also ==
- List of unlucky symbols
- Homophonic puns in Mandarin Chinese
- Tetraphobia
