= Chinese numerology =

System of belief in lucky and unlucky numbers

Some numbers are believed by some to be auspicious or lucky (吉利, pinyin: jílì; Cantonese Yale: gātleih) or inauspicious or unlucky (不吉, pinyin: bùjí; Cantonese Yale: bātgāt) based on the Chinese word that the number sounds similar to. The numbers 6 and 8 are widely considered to be lucky, while 4 is considered unlucky. These traditions are not unique to Chinese culture, with other countries with a history of Han characters also having similar beliefs stemming from these concepts.

== Zero ==
The number 0 (零, pinyin: líng) is the beginning of all things and is generally considered a good number, because it sounds like 良 (pinyin: liáng), which means 'good'.

== One ==
The number 1 (一, pinyin: yī; Cantonese Yale: yāt) is neither auspicious nor inauspicious. It is a number given to winners to indicate first place. But it can also symbolize loneliness or being single. For example: November 11 is the Singles' Day in China, as the date has four '1's.

== Two ==
The number 2 (二, cardinal, pinyin: èr or 兩, used with units, pinyin: liǎng) is most often considered a good number in Chinese culture. In Cantonese, 2 (二 or 兩, Cantonese Yale: yih or léuhng) is homophonous with the characters for "easy" (易, Cantonese Yale: yih) and "bright" (亮, Cantonese Yale: leuhng), respectively. There is a Chinese saying: "good things come in pairs". It is common to repeat characters in product brand names, such as the character 喜 (pinyin: xǐ; Cantonese Yale: héi; lit. 'joy'), can be repeated to form the character 囍 (pinyin: shuāng xǐ; Cantonese Yale: sēung héi; lit. 'double happiness').

- 24 (Cantonese Yale: yih sei) in Cantonese sounds like "easy die" (易死, Cantonese Yale: yih séi).
- 28 (Cantonese Yale: yih baat) in Cantonese sounds like "easy prosper" (易發, Cantonese Yale: yih faat).

== Three ==
The number 3 (三, pinyin: sān; Cantonese Yale: sāam) sounds like 生 (pinyin: shēng; Cantonese Yale: sāang), which means "to live" or "life" so it's considered a good number. It's significant since it is one of three important stages in a person's life (birth, marriage, and death).
On the other hand, number 3 (三,pinyin: sān; Cantonese Yale: sāam) sounds like 散 (pinyin: sàn; Cantonese Yale: saan) which means "to split" or "to separate" or "to part ways" or "to break up with" so it is a bad number too.

== Four ==
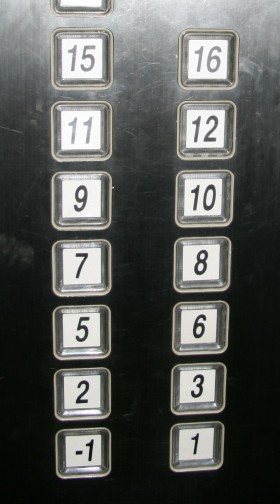
Numbers 4, 13 and 14 are omitted in some Chinese buildings.

While not traditionally considered an unlucky number, 4 has in recent times, gained an association with bad luck because of its pronunciation, predominantly for the Cantonese.

The belief that the number 4 is unlucky originated in China, where the Chinese have avoided the number since ancient times. The Chinese interpretation of 4 as unlucky is a more recent development, considering there are many examples, sayings and elements of the number 4 considered as auspicious instead in Chinese history.

The number 4 (四, pinyin: sì; Cantonese Yale: sei) is sometimes considered an unlucky number particularly in Cantonese because the way it is pronounced in the Cantonese dialect is nearly homophonous to the word "death" (死 pinyin: sǐ; Cantonese Yale: séi).

Thus, some buildings in East Asia omit floors and room numbers containing 4, similar to the Western practice of some buildings not having a 13th floor because 13 is considered unlucky. Where East Asian and Western cultures blend, such as in Hong Kong, it is possible in some buildings that the thirteenth floor along with all the floors with 4s to be omitted. Thus a building whose top floor is numbered 100 would in fact have just eighty floors (plus the "G" or ground floor if the British numbering system was used). Similarly in Vietnamese, the number 4 (四) is called tứ in Sino-Vietnamese, which sounds like tử (死) (death) in Vietnamese.

The number 4 can also symbolise luck, prosperity and happiness in Chinese culture. In the musical scale, 4 is pronounced Fa, which sounds like 发 (fortune) in Mandarin. In this case, some Chinese people regard 4 as the propitious and lucky number. There is also an old Chinese idiom 四季发财 (To be Wealthy All Year).

In traditional Chinese history and other Chinese dialect groups like the Teochew people, the number 4 is considered a very lucky and auspicious number. For starters, it is an even number. There is a preference of even numbers over odd numbers. Many historical and philosophical Chinese concepts are also in groups of 4.

Another common explanation is that the number 4 in Teochew sounds like or rhymes with the word "happiness" or "joy" (喜 Teochew: hi2).

Finally, another plausible explanation is that in the Teochew dialect, the number 4 (Teochew: si) is similarly pronounced to the word "silk" (絲 Teochew: si1) or "Emperor's seal" (璽 Teochew: si2), a symbol of royalty, power and prosperity.

In Teochew culture, it is acceptable and considered lucky to give "red packets" of money (紅包 Teochew: ang5 bao1) in monetary groups of 4 (e.g. $4, $40, $44, $440 etc...) during Chinese New Year and other festivities like weddings. Stacks of 4 mandarin oranges (Citrus reticulata) are often presented on grand or formal Teochew occasions, the most common stack configuration with 3 mandarin oranges below and 1 on top.

The house numbers with 4 and 44, while shunned by the Cantonese, are often chosen by Teochews for its particular auspicious connotations. Heng Pang Kiat JP Esq. (aka Hing Pang Kiat) (c 1856 – 1930), a prominent Teochew businessman and property developer in Singapore, had specially picked the house number 44 on Emerald Hill, even though he had a choice of house numbers from 38 to 52, from his property developments in Emerald Hill.

There is an exception for the Cantonese with the house number 54, which is considered very lucky as it sounds like 唔死 (m̀ séi) meaning "Will not die and shall live forever". The number 9 is considered the highest number representing great success in Chinese numerology, thus the number 54 can also be interpreted as 5 + 4 = 9, to mean great success.

The transmission of this superstition could also be linked to religion. Buddhism played a significant role in the spread of Chinese characters and culture across the region. In Japan, the idea that the number 4 was once considered auspicious is documented in the Kojiki, emphasizing its connection to good fortune. However, as Chinese influence grew, and the pronunciation became closer to "shi," it began to be associated with death. In Korea, Buddhism's influence was more prominent when the religion was first introduced, and in Vietnam, the Sino-Vietnamese pronunciations might have contributed to this superstition. Buddhism provided the platform for discussing death, giving rise to this cultural foundation.

The Chinese character for four (四) deviates from the pattern of the first three numbers, though an archaic variant 亖 did exist prior to standardization by the Qin dynasty.

== Five ==
The number 5 (五, pinyin: wǔ; Cantonese Yale: ńg) sounds like "me" in Mandarin (吾, pinyin: wú; lit. 'me') and Cantonese (唔, Cantonese Yale: m̀; lit. 'not'). It is considered a lucky number. Thus, the number is used for the measurements and naming of the official state car of CCP General Secretary Xi Jinping, or the Hongqi L5.

- 53 (pinyin: wǔ sān; Cantonese Yale: ńg sāam) sounds like "my life" in Mandarin (吾生, wú shēng) and "not birth" in Cantonese (唔生, m̀ sāang).
- 54 (pinyin: wǔ sì; Cantonese Yale: ńg sei) sounds like "my death" in Mandarin (吾死, wú sǐ) and "not die" in Cantonese (唔死, m̀ séi).
- 58 (pinyin: wǔ bā; Cantonese Yale: ńg baat) sounds like "me prosper" in Mandarin (吾發, pinyin: wǔ fā) and "no prosperity" in Cantonese (唔發 or 沒發, m̀ faat or mut faat respectively).

Five is also associated with the five elements (Water, Fire, Earth, Wood, and Metal) in Chinese philosophy, and in turn was historically associated with the Emperor of China. For example, the Tiananmen gate, being the main thoroughfare to the Forbidden City, has five arches.

== Six ==
The number 6 (六, pinyin: liù) in Mandarin sounds like "slick" or "smooth" (溜, pinyin: liū). In Cantonese, 6 (Cantonese Yale: luk6) sounds like "good fortune" or "happiness" (祿, 樂 Cantonese Yale: lok6). Therefore 6 is considered a good number for business.

== Seven ==
The number 7 (七, pinyin: qī) in Mandarin sounds like "even" in Mandarin (齊, pinyin: qí), so it is a good number for relationships. It also sounds like "arise" (起, pinyin: qǐ) and "life essence" (氣, pinyin: qì) in Mandarin. Seven can also be considered an unlucky number since the 7th month is a "ghost month". It also sounds like "to deceive" (欺, pinyin: qī) in Mandarin. In Cantonese, 7 (Cantonese Yale: chāt) sounds like 𨳍 (Cantonese Yale: chat), which is a vulgar way of saying "penis".

== Eight ==
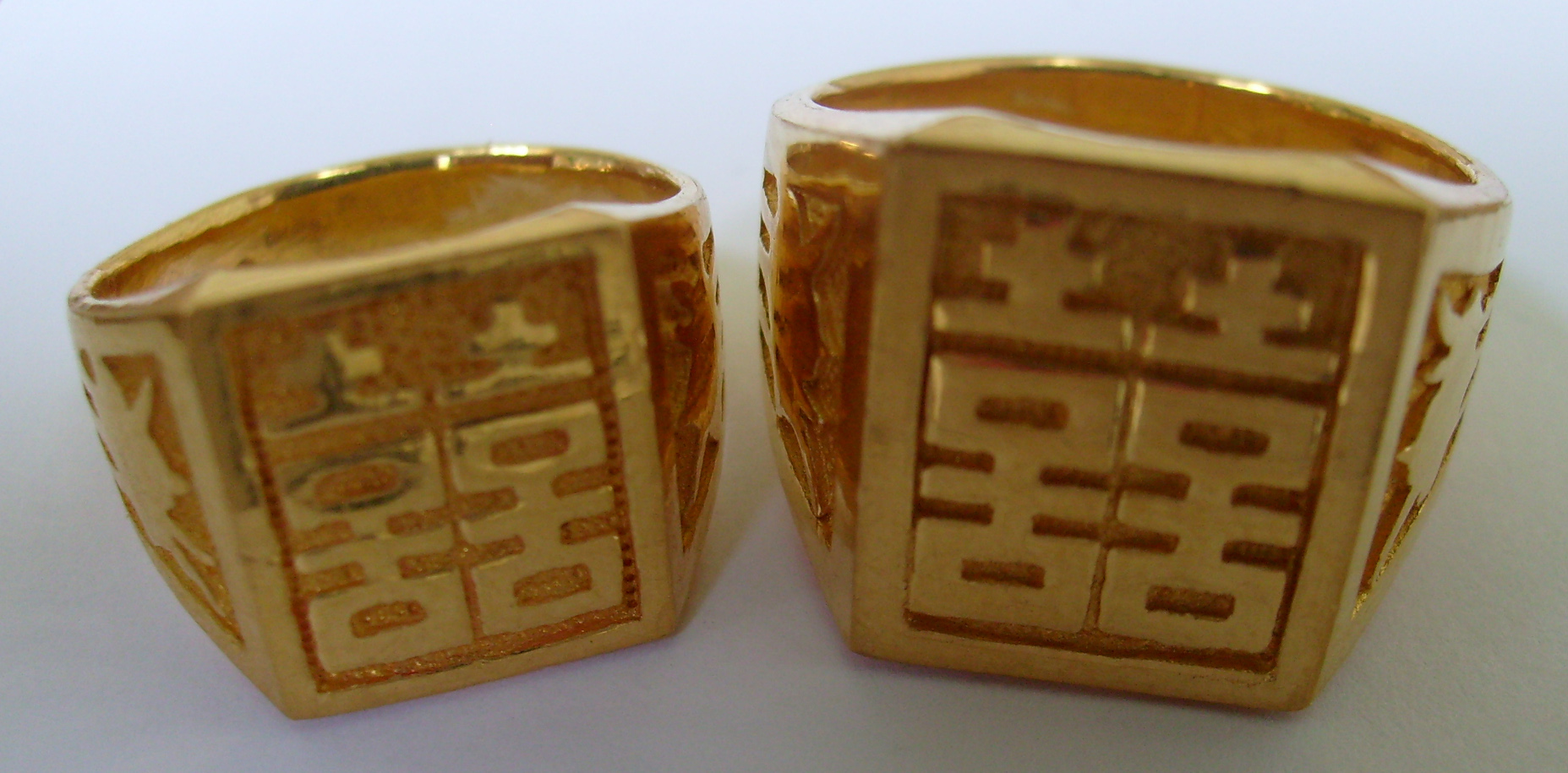
"Double happiness" ring design

The number 8 (八, pinyin: bā; Cantonese Yale: baat) sounds like "發" (pinyin: fā; Cantonese Yale: faat; lit. 'to prosper'). There is also a visual resemblance between 88 and 囍 (pinyin: shuāng xǐ; Cantonese Yale: sēung héi; lit. 'double happiness'), a popular decorative design composed of two stylized characters 喜 (pinyin: xǐ; Cantonese Yale: héi; lit. 'happiness').

The number 8 is viewed as such an auspicious number that being assigned a number with several eights is considered very lucky.

- Steve Wozniak held the United States telephone number +1(408)888-8888 for many years in Silicon Valley. Several businesses in Silicon Valley have multiple "8" characters in their names, particularly near the cluster of wealthy Chinese ex-pats in and around Cupertino, California, the original home of Apple computer when Steve Jobs was invited back to run the company after Next.
- In 2014, the Australian Department of Home Affairs renamed their previous Business Skills (provisional) visas, subclasses 160–165, to 188 and 888 Subclasses, both of which include eights.
- In 2003, the phone number "+86 28 8888 8888" was sold to Sichuan Airlines for CN¥2.33 million (approximately US$280,000).
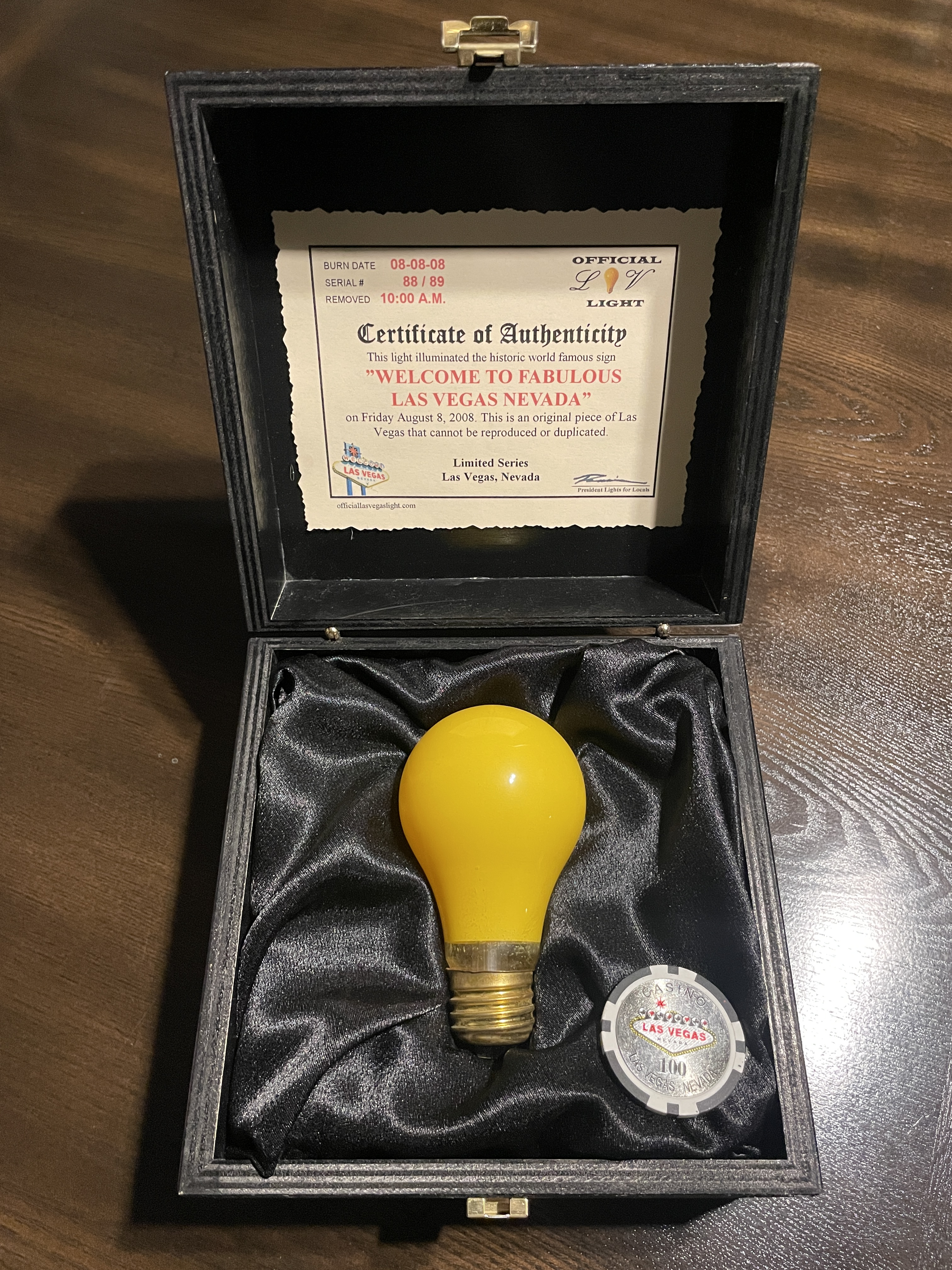
- Official Las Vegas Light Bulb #88 from 08-08-08
  In 2008, an unidentified Las Vegas local purchased bulb #88 on 08-08-08 from the Welcome to Fabulous Las Vegas sign, sold by YESCO, who provides maintenance of the sign, and sells the replaced light bulbs as Official Las Vegas Lights. An employee of the company indicated that another person had offered $750,000 to the original buyer who declined to sell.
- The opening ceremony of the 2008 Summer Olympics in Beijing began on 8/8/08 at 8 minutes and 8 seconds past 8 pm local time (UTC+08).
- China, Taiwan, Hong Kong, Macau, Malaysia, the Philippines and Singapore use the time zone UTC+08:00.
- The Asian American mass media company 88rising (known primarily for being the record label of artists such as Joji and Rich Brian) adopted the name in 2016, and has referenced its symbolism in the titles of several events, including the 2018 US tour 88rising Double Happiness.
- The Petronas Twin Towers in Malaysia each have 88 floors.
- Buick offers a minivan for the Chinese market under the GL8 name, a model name not used in any other market.
- The Air Canada route from Shanghai to Toronto is Flight AC88, and the route from Hong Kong to Vancouver is Flight AC8.
- The KLM route from Hong Kong to Amsterdam is Flight KL888.
- The Etihad Airways route from Abu Dhabi to Beijing then onwards to Nagoya is Flight EY888.
- The United Airlines route from Beijing to San Francisco is Flight UA888, the route from Beijing to Newark is Flight UA88, and the route from Chengdu to San Francisco is Flight UA8.
- The Air Astana route from Beijing to Almaty is Flight KC888.
- The British Airways route from Chengdu to London is Flight BA88.
- The Cathay Pacific route from Hong Kong to Vancouver is Flight CX888.
- Singapore Airlines reserves flight numbers beginning with the number 8 for flights to and from mainland China, Hong Kong (except SQ1/2 to and from San Francisco via Hong Kong) and Taiwan (i.e., a typical flight between Singapore and Beijing (Capital) would be numbered SQ802/807).
- SriLankan Airlines reserves flight numbers beginning with the number 8 for flights to mainland China and Hong Kong.
- The Turkish Airlines route from Istanbul to Beijing is TK88.
- The US Treasury has sold 70,000 dollar bills with serial numbers that contain 4 eights.
- Boeing delivered the 8,888th 737 to come off the production line to Xiamen Airlines. The airplane, a Next-Generation 737–800, features a special livery commemorating the airplane's significance.
- In Singapore, a breeder of rare Dragon fish (Asian arowana, which are "lucky fish" and being a rare species, are required to be microchipped), makes sure to use numbers with plenty of eights in their microchip tag numbers, and appears to reserve particular numbers especially rich in eights and sixes (e.g., 702088880006688) for particularly valuable specimens.
- As part of grand opening promotions, a Commerce Bank branch in New York's Chinatown raffled off safety deposit box No. 888.
- An "auspicious" numbering system was adopted by the developers of 39 Conduit Road Hong Kong, where the top floor was "88" – Chinese for double fortune. It is already common in Hong Kong for ~4th floors not to exist; there is no requirement by the Buildings Department for numbering other than that it being "made in a logical order." A total of 43 intermediate floor numbers are omitted from 39 Conduit Road: those missing include 14, 24, 34, 54, 64, all floors between 40 and 49; the floor number which follows 68 is 88.
- Similar to the common Western practice of using "9" for price points, it is common to see "8" being used in its place to achieve the same psychological effect. So for example menu prices like $58, $88 are frequently seen.

== Nine ==
The number 9 (九, pinyin: jiǔ; Cantonese Yale: gáu) was historically associated with the Emperor of China, and the number was frequently used in matters relating to the Emperor, before the establishment of the imperial examinations officials were organized in the nine-rank system, the nine bestowments were rewards the Emperor made for officials of extraordinary capacity and loyalty, while the nine familial exterminations was one of the harshest punishments the Emperor sentenced; the Emperor's robes often had nine dragons, and Chinese mythology held that the dragon has nine children. Also, the number 9 sounds like "long lasting" (久, pinyin: jiǔ; Cantonese Yale: gáu), so it is often used in weddings.

In Cantonese, the number 9 is also a vulgar way of saying penis (𨳊, Cantonese Yale: gāu), similar to 7 as well, with 9 referring to an erect penis instead.

== Combinations ==
- 48: Any 3 digit numbers that ends with 48 sounds like "wealthy for X lifetimes", for example, 748 (pinyin: qī sì bā) sounds like "七世發" (pinyin: qī shì fā) meaning "wealthy for 7 lifetimes".
- 167 (Cantonese Yale: yāt luhk chāt) in Cantonese sounds like "一碌𨳍" (Cantonese Yale: yāt lūk chat), which is a vulgar way of saying "a dick".
- 168 (pinyin: yī liù bā; Cantonese Yale: yāt luhk baat) sounds like "一路发" (pinyin: yī lù fā; Cantonese Yale: yāt louh faat) meaning "fortune all the way".
- 250 (pinyin: èr bǎi wǔ) is usually used to insult someone the speaker considers extremely foolish. Alternative ways such as 兩百五 (lǐang bǎi wǔ) and 二百五十 (èr bǎi wǔ shí) do not have this meaning.
- 448 (pinyin: sì sì bā) sounds like "死先發" (pinyin: sǐ xiān fā) meaning "wealthy on death".
- 514 (pinyin: wǔ yī sì) in Mandarin sounds like "我要死" (pinyin: wǒ yào sǐ; lit. 'I want to die').
- 518 (pinyin: wǔ yāo bā) in Mandarin sounds like "我要发" (pinyin: wǒ yào fā) which means "I am going to prosper".
- 520 (pinyin: wǔ èr líng) in Mandarin sounds similar to "我愛你" (pinyin: wǒ ài nǐ; lit. 'I love you').
- 548 (Cantonese Yale: ńg sei baat) in Cantonese sounds like "唔洗發"(Cantonese Yale: m̀ sái faat) meaning "no need to be wealthy".
- 748 (pinyin: qī sì bā) in Mandarin sounds like "去死吧" (pinyin: qù sǐ ba; lit. 'go die').
- 1314 (pinyin: yī sān yī sì; Cantonese Yale: yāt sāam yāt sei) sounds like "一生一世" (pinyin: yīshēngyīshì; Cantonese Yale: yāt sāng yāt sai; lit. 'one life one lifetime') meaning "forever" and is often used romantically.
- 5354 (Cantonese Yale: ńg sāam ńg sei) in Cantonese sounds like "唔生唔死" (Cantonese Yale: m̀ sāang m̀ séi) meaning "not alive not dead", referring to being in a miserable state like one is almost dead.
- 7414 in Mandarin is like "go to die"
- 7456 (pinyin: qī sì wǔ liù) in Mandarin sounds like "气死我了" (pinyin: qì sǐ wǒ le) meaning "to make me angry" or "to piss me off".
- 9413 (pinyin: jiǔ sì yī sān; Cantonese Yale: gáu sei yāt sāam) sounds like "九死一生" (pinyin: jiǔ sǐ yī shēng; Cantonese Yale: gáu séi yāt sāang; lit. 'nine die one live') meaning 90% chance of being dead and only 10% chance of being alive, or survived such situations (a narrow escape).
- 5201314 (pinyin: wǔ èr líng yī sān yī sì) in Mandarin sounds like "我愛你一生一世" (pinyin: wǒ ài nǐ yīshēngyīshì; lit. 'I love you a lifetime').

== See also ==
- Bagua
- Chinese mathematics
- Chinese number gestures
- Chinese numerals
- Color in Chinese culture
- Culture of China
- King Wen sequence
- Numerology
- Homophonic puns in Mandarin Chinese
- Faux pas derived from Chinese pronunciation
