= Aphorismus =

Figure of speech that calls into question if a word is properly used

Aphorismus (from the Greek: ἀφορισμός, aphorismós, "a marking off", also "rejection, banishment") is a figure of speech that calls into question if a word is properly used ("How can you call yourself a man?"). It often appears in the form of a rhetorical question which is meant to imply a difference between the present thing being discussed and the general notion of the subject.

== Examples ==
- "For you have but mistook me all this while. / I live with bread like you, feel want, / Taste grief, need friends: subjected thus, / How can you say to me I am a king?" William Shakespeare, Richard II Act 3, scene 2, 174-177
- "It depends on what the meaning of the word 'is' is." Bill Clinton, August 17, 1998

== See also ==
- Figure of speech
