= Alomancy =

Ancient form of divination

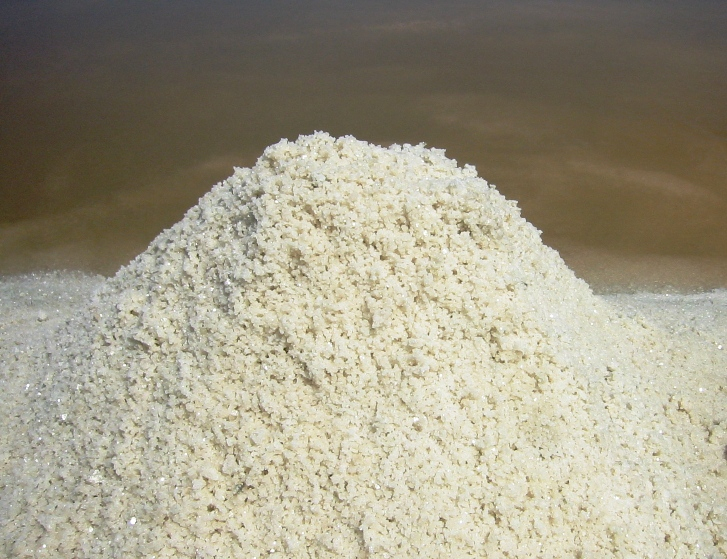
Sea salt crystals which may be used in 'Alomancy'

Alomancy, also called adromancy, ydromancie, idromancie, and halomancy, is an ancient form of divination. Similar to many other forms of divination, the diviner casts salt crystals into the air and interprets the patterns as it falls to the ground or travels through the air.

Salt itself is often intertwined with luck, and some of this ancient tradition can be seen in the superstitions, such as the perceived misfortune when the salt cellar is overturned, and the custom of throwing salt over the left shoulder for good luck.

One form of alomancy consists of the casting of salt into a fire, which is considered a type of pyromancy.
