= Hodology =

Hodology is the study of pathways. The word derives from the Greek hodos, meaning "path". It is used in various contexts:

- In neuroscience, it is the study of the interconnections of brain cells, now frequently called connectomics
- In psychology, it is a term introduced by Kurt Lewin (1890–1947) to describe paths in a person's "life space"
- In philosophy, it is the study of interconnected ideas
- In geography, it is the study of paths
