= Longtail (rat) =

Slang for 'rat'

On the Isle of Man, longtail is a euphemism used to denote a rat, as a relatively modern superstition has arisen that it is considered bad luck to mention this word. The origins of this superstition date to sea-taboos, where certain words and practices were not mentioned aboard ship, for fear of attracting bad luck (or bad weather).

The Manx Gaelic author Edward Faragher (also known by his Manx nickname 'Ned Beg Hom Ruy') recorded in his work 'Skeealyn 'sy Ghailck' that during his time working on fishing boats in the 19th century "It was forbidden to name a hare on board, or a rabbit, or a rat or a cat. The hare was 'the big-eared fellow', and the rabbit ‘pomet’, and the rat ‘sacote’, and the cat ‘scratcher'". In the modern superstition, the taboo only applies to the rat, and the term 'sacote' is no longer used.

Although this particular sea-taboo was one amongst many and was not held to apply on land, it has become a popular modern belief that the word is somehow unlucky and the taboo has been adopted by some as a typical Manx practice, despite the fact that the old Manx had no qualms in using the word, or its Manx equivalent, "roddan". In modern times, many non-local and unsuperstitious people will refrain from using the word "rat" where its acceptability is in doubt.

Local socially acceptable alternatives for the superstitious also include joey, ringie, queerfella, iron fella and roddan. Recently, young people have also begun saying r-a-t, owing to the influence of English immigrants.

Similar taboos can be found as far north as Shetland. Other sea taboos included pigs, cats, and knives. There is a comparable and apparently also relatively modern taboo against uttering the word 'rabbit' on the Isle of Portland.
