= Spilling water for luck =

Eurasiatic folk custom

Spilling water for luck is a folk custom in Armenia, Azerbaijan, Bulgaria, Bosnia, North Macedonia, Serbia, Turkey, Iraq, Iran, Afghanistan and other nearby countries. According to folk belief, spilling water behind the person who goes on a journey, or to do a job, will bring good luck, and is done so that the travel or the job will end happily. It is also practiced when going to school, on an exam, for a job interview, going into the army and the like.

In the ethnology of the Balkan Peninsula countries, it is considered that spilled or running water symbolizes mobility and ease of movement, since it does not stop or get stuck, and so spilling of water is done so that the job someone started would go as smoothly as the spilled water. At the very act of spilling water in some areas it is said: "Let him go clean and clear as water."

== See also ==
- Break a leg
- Serbian traditions
