= The Scottish Play =

Euphemism for the play Macbeth

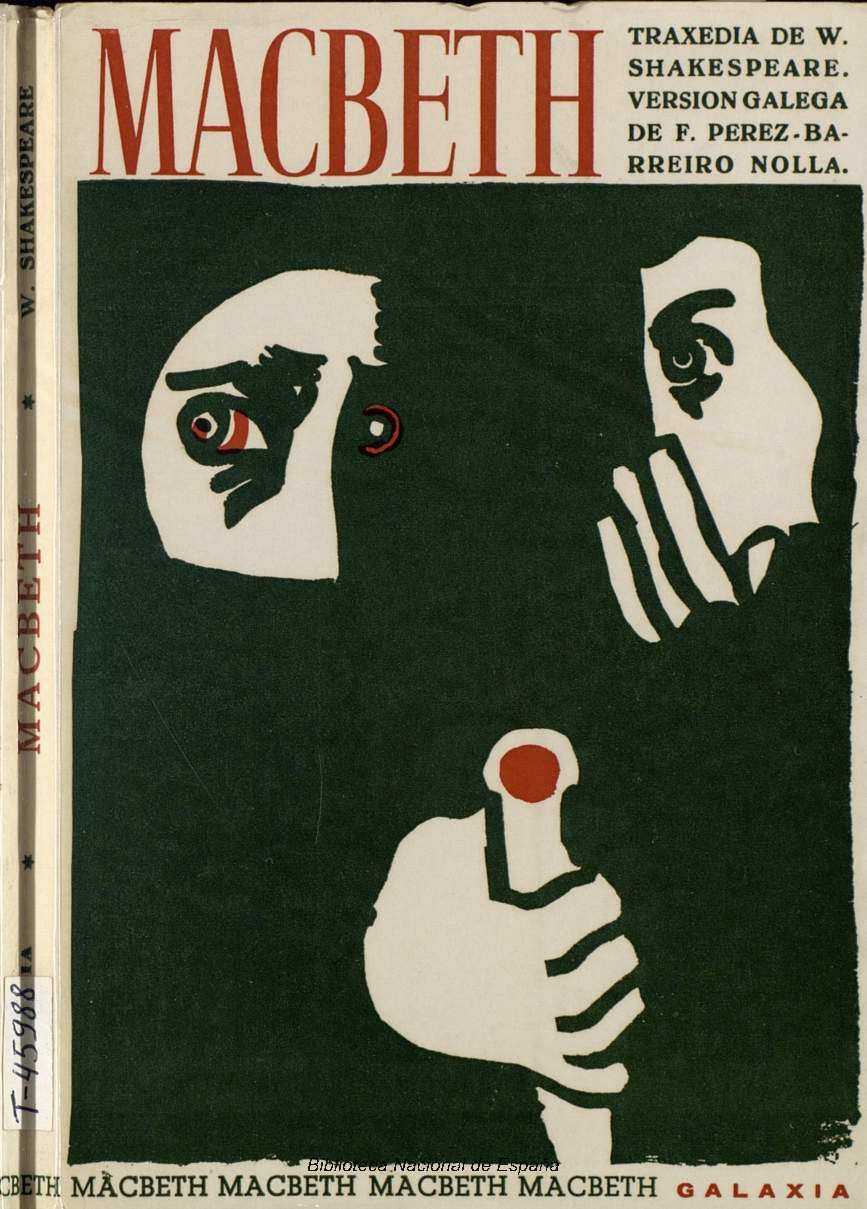
A 1972 book cover for a Galician printing of Macbeth. Theatrical superstition holds that speaking the name Macbeth inside a theatre will lead to a curse.

The Scottish Play and the Bard's play are euphemisms for the William Shakespeare play Macbeth. The first is a reference to the play's Scottish setting, and the second is a reference to Shakespeare's popular nickname. According to a theatrical superstition, called the Scottish curse, speaking the name Macbeth inside a theatre, other than as called for in the script while rehearsing or performing, will cause disaster. On top of the aforementioned alternative titles, some people also refer to the classical tragedy as Mackers for this reason. Variations of the superstition may also forbid quoting lines from the play within a theatre except as part of an actual rehearsal or performance of the play.

Because of this superstition, the title character is often referred to as the Scottish King or Scottish Lord. Lady Macbeth is often referred to as the Scottish Lady or Lady M. However, one of the most popular traditions among Shakespeare-specific actors allows "Macbeth" as a reference to the character. Nonetheless, many call the pair "Macb" and "Lady Macb".

== Origins ==
The traditional origin is said to be a curse set upon the play by a coven of witches, angry at Shakespeare for using a real spell. One hypothesis for the origin of this superstition is that Macbeth, being a popular play, was commonly put on by theatres in financial trouble, or that the high production costs of Macbeth put theatres in financial trouble. Hence, an association was made between productions of Macbeth and theatres going out of business.

== Cleansing ritual ==
When the name of the play is spoken in a theatre, tradition requires the person who spoke it to leave, perform traditional cleansing rituals, and be invited back in. The rituals are supposed to ward off the evil that uttering the play's name is feared to bring on.

The rituals include turning three times, spitting over one's left shoulder, swearing, or reciting a line from another of Shakespeare's plays. Popular lines for this purpose include, "Angels and ministers of grace defend us" (Hamlet 1.IV), "If we shadows have offended" (A Midsummer Night's Dream 5.II), and "Fair thoughts and happy hours attend on you" (The Merchant of Venice, 3.IV). A more elaborate cleansing ritual involves leaving the theatre, spinning around and brushing oneself off, and saying "Macbeth" three times before entering again. Some production groups insist that the offender may not re-enter the theatre until invited to do so, therefore making it easy to punish frequent offenders by leaving them outside.

A portrayal of the ritual occurs in the 1983 film The Dresser, in which the lead character Sir is the offender, and his dresser Norman officiates over the propitiation.

The cleansing rituals have been parodied numerous times in popular culture, including in Blackadder, Slings and Arrows, The Simpsons, The West Wing, and Make It Pop. For example, in the Blackadder episode "Sense and Senility", a parody ritual performed by two actors involves slapping each other's hands pat-a-cake fashion, followed by tweaking the other person's nose. In Slings and Arrows, a guest director mocks the superstition by saying "Macbeth" onstage. While spinning around, she falls off on her third spin, resulting in an injury that takes her out of commission for the rest of the season. On The Simpsons, the core five are invited into a performance by Ian McKellen (in Scottish attire, clearly in the title role). The family keeps saying the title, which only makes more bad luck strike the actor, including lightning striking him and the "MAC" falling from the signage (leaving the "BETH").

Patrick Stewart, on the radio program Ask Me Another, asserted that "if you have played the role of the Scottish thane, then you are allowed to say the title, any time anywhere."

== Historical mishaps ==
English actor Harold Norman, playing Macbeth, was mortally wounded in a sword fight during a performance of Macbeth at Oldham's Colosseum Theatre on 30 January 1947. He was hospitalized and died three weeks later.

On 2 December 1964, a fire burned down the D. Maria II National Theatre in Lisbon, Portugal. At the time, the play being shown was Macbeth.

In 1980, a production of Macbeth at The Old Vic starring Peter O'Toole, often referred to as Macdeath, was performed. It was reviewed so badly that the Prospect Theatre Company disbanded shortly after the play.

Mishaps on the set of his film Opera led director Dario Argento to believe that the film had been affected by the Macbeth curse; the opera being performed within the film is Giuseppe Verdi's Macbeth.

In 1988, Bulgarian singer, coach, and translator Bantcho Bantchevsky committed suicide while attending a nationally broadcast matinee of Verdi's Macbeth. He propelled himself backward from a balcony railing at New York's Metropolitan Opera House, Lincoln Square.

In 2014, during the filming of Justin Kurzel's Macbeth (2015), the cast and crew began referring to it as "The Scottish Film" after a series of strange incidents happened on set. Kurzel said he tried to dismiss the superstition, however, a number of things happened on set that made him question the history of the play. Kurzel hoped the name change would improve their luck. While filming on the Isle of Skye under heavy rain, sleet and snow, some members of the cast suffered from hypothermia, and Marion Cotillard (who played Lady Macbeth) fell into a bog and submerged up to her neck. Kurzel said Cotillard disappeared, and for a moment he thought they had lost her. It took two crew members to pull Cotillard out as her feet sank into the mud. Kurzel said that filming Macbeth felt like playing with a Ouija board. "After 18 takes of Marion doing "Come you spirits..." the atmosphere gets pretty weird. Once you start invoking certain things, it is like you're getting close to...evil, really." Kurzel said that there was "a supernatural element to filming in Skye in January, it seemed to be a place where spirits walk".

Ari Aster, writer and director of Hereditary (2018), said that during filming, "Alex Wolff told me not to say the name of William Shakespeare's Scottish play out loud because of some superstitious theater legend. I smugly announced the name, and then one of our lights burst during the shooting of the following scene."

In 2022, at the 94th Academy Awards, Chris Rock congratulated Denzel Washington on his performance in The Tragedy of Macbeth, saying the name of the Scottish play aloud in the Dolby Theatre. Moments later, Rock was slapped by Will Smith after making a joke implied to be about the alopecia that Smith's wife, Jada Pinkett Smith, was struggling with at the time. Viewers, including playwright Lynn Nottage, quickly took to social media to joke that Rock had suffered the curse of the Scottish play.

Further instances include the Astor Place Riot in 1849, injuries sustained by actors at a 1937 performance at The Old Vic that starred Laurence Olivier, Diana Wynyard's accidental fall in 1948, and burns suffered by Charlton Heston in 1954.

== See also ==
- Curse of Scotland, a nickname for the nine of diamonds playing card
