= Knocking on wood =

Apotropaic tradition believed to ward off evil

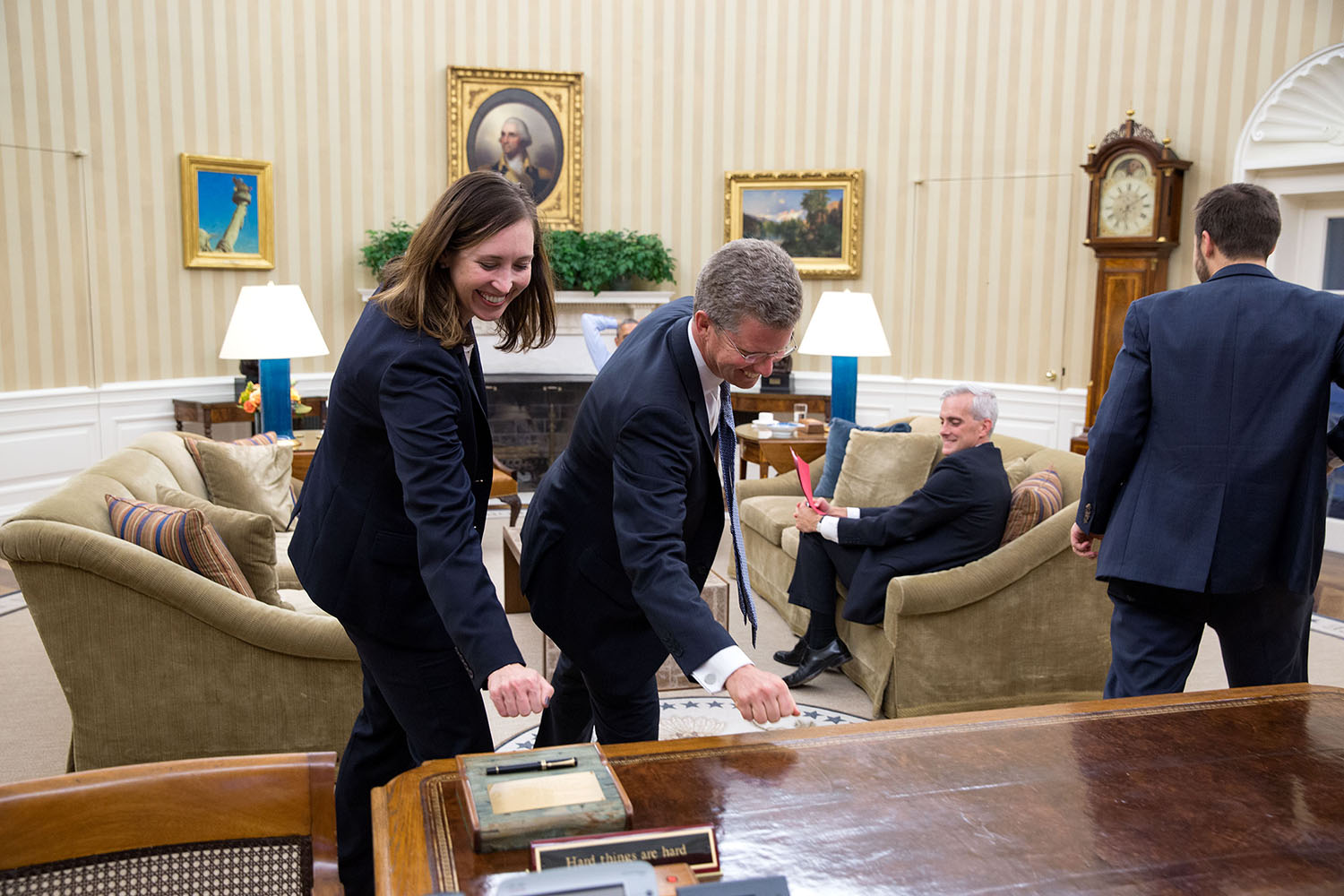
Katie Beirne Fallon and Shaun Donovan knocking on wood in the Oval Office (2015)

Knocking on wood (also phrased touching wood or touch wood) is an apotropaic tradition of literally touching, tapping, or knocking on wood, or merely stating that one is doing or intending to do so, in order to avoid "tempting fate" after making a favorable prediction or boast, or a declaration concerning one's own death or another unfavorable situation.

== Origin of use in the English language ==
There are connections between ancient spirituality and trees influencing fortune. In the pre-Christian beliefs of the Germanic people, for example, three Norns send fate up into the universe through a tree. Languages descended from these people include concepts such as "knock on wood", "touch wood" or "three times wood", although only the first two expressions are in the descended English language specifically. Meanwhile, the ancient Celtic peoples also believed that the act of touching wood called on spirits or gods of the trees. Christians tie the practice to the symbolism of the wood of the cross of crucifixion. Folklore researcher Steve Roud suggests that the widespread, modern use however derives from a form of tag called "Tiggy Touchwood" in which players are safe from being tagged if they are touching wood.

== Similar traditions across the world ==
- In Bosnia and Herzegovina, Croatia, Slovenia, Montenegro, and Serbia, there is also the habit of knocking on wood when saying something positive or affirmative about someone or something and not wanting that to change. Frequently the movement of knocking on nearby wood is followed by da kucnem u drvo / да куцнем у дрво ("I will knock on wood"), or sometimes by da ne ureknem / да не урекнем ("I don't want to jinx it").
- In Brazil and Portugal, bater na madeira ("knock on wood") is done physically; three knocks are required after giving an example of a bad thing eventually happening. No verbalization is required, just the three knocks on the closest piece or object of wood. In the absence of wood, someone can say bate na madeira, to prevent the bad thing to happen. People do not actually believe knocking three times on a piece of wood will really protect them, but it is a social habit and it is polite to do so to demonstrate that one does not want that bad thing one is talking about to actually happen.
- In Bulgaria, the superstition of "knock on wood" (чукам на дърво chukam na dǎrvo) is reserved for protection against the evil, and is not typically used for attracting good luck. Usually people engage in the practice in reaction to bad news, actual or merely imagined. In most cases the nearest wooden object is used (in some areas, however, tables are exempt); if there are no such objects within immediate reach, a common tongue-in-cheek practice is to knock on one's head. Knocking on wood is often followed by lightly pulling one's earlobe with the same hand. Common phrases to accompany the ritual are "God guard us" (Бог да ни пази Bog da ni pazi) and "may the Devil not hear" (да не чуе Дяволът da ne chue Djavolǎt).
- In the Czech Republic, the phrase "I have to knock it down" (Musím to zaklepat) is often said, before knocking on wood, glass, one's own teeth, or occasionally, the forehead.
- In Denmark, the saying is 7, 9, 13 / syv, ni, tretten (usually accompanied by knocking under a table), as these numbers have traditionally been associated with magic.
- In Egypt, إمسك الخشب emsek el-khashab ("hold the wood") is said when mentioning either good luck one has had in the past or hopes one has for the future. When referring to past good luck the expression is usually used in hopes of the good thing continuing to occur via its spoken acknowledgment, as well as preventing envy.
- In modern-day England, Scotland and Ireland the expression "touch wood" is more commonly heard than "knock on wood".
- In modern day Finland the saying is "Koputa puuta", knock on wood. It is typically said to avoid evil when someone foresees (out aloud) something bad happening in the future.
- In Georgia, a ხეზე დაკაკუნება kheze daḳaḳuneba ("knocking on wood") is performed when one mentions a bad possibility that could take place in future. Usually the person knocks three times. It is also done when one experiences a bad omen.
- In Germany, one finds the expressions "knock on wood" and "three times wood" Dreimal Holz.
- In Greece and Cyprus the saying χτύπα ξύλο chtýpa xýlo ("knock on wood") is said when hearing someone say something negative in order to prevent it from happening.
- In Hungary, the phrase lekopogom ("I am knocking it down") is used to prevent bad luck, and should be carried out by left hand, three times on the underside of some wooden object, often tables.
- In Indonesia, Malaysia, and Thailand, when someone is saying bad things, the one that hears it would knock on wood (or other suitable surface) and knock on their forehead while saying amit-amit or amit-amit jabang bayi (Indonesia), choi or tak cun tak cun (Malaysia).
- In Iran, when one says something good about something or somebody, they might knock on wood and say بزنم به تخته چشم نخوره bezan-am be taxteh, cheshm naxoreh ("[I] am knocking on wood to prevent [them]/it from being jinxed"). The evil eye and the concept of being jinxed are common phobias and superstitious beliefs in Iranian culture, and Iranians traditionally believe knocking on wood wards off evil spirits.
- In Italy, tocca ferro ("touch iron") is used, especially after seeing an undertaker or something related to death.
- In Catalonia, tocar ferro ("to touch iron") is used, meaning protecting yourself against bad luck.
- In Latin America, it is also tradition to physically knock or touch a wooden object. A variant requires that the object does not have legs (tocar madera sin patas), which rules out chairs, tables and beds.
- In Lebanon and Syria, the saying دقّ عالخشب duqq ‘al-khashab ("knock on [the] wood") is said when hearing someone say something negative in order to prevent it from happening. It is also largely observed when saying something positive or affirmative about someone or something and not wanting that to change.
- In the Netherlands, there is a habit of knocking on a(n unpainted) piece of wood, both with and without saying (even) afkloppen – literally, "to (quickly) knock on [something]".
- In Norway, the saying is bank i bordet ("knock on the table").
- In Poland, there is a habit of knocking on (unpainted) wood (which may be preceded by saying odpukać w niemalowane drewno; or simply odpukać; – literally meaning "to knock on unpainted wood") when saying something negative – to prevent it from happening – or, more rarely, something positive – in order not to "spoil it". In the Czech Republic, this is often accompanied for stronger effect by knocking on one's teeth, a piece of building stone, or metal, reasoning that these (as opposed to wood) survive even fire.
- In Romania, there is also a superstition that one can avoid bad things aforementioned by literally knocking on wood (Romanian: a bate în lemn). Wood tables are exempted. One of the possible reasons could be that there is a monastery practice to call people to pray by playing / knocking the simantron.
- In Spain tocar madera and in France toucher du bois ("to touch wood"), it is something said when one wants one's luck or a good situation to continue, e.g. Ha ido bien toda la semana y, toco madera, seguirá bien el fin de semana ("It's been good all week and, touching wood, the weekend will stay good").
- In Sweden, a common expression is "pepper, pepper, touch wood" (peppar, peppar, ta i trä), referring to throwing pepper over one's shoulder and touching a wooden object.
- In Turkey, "tahtaya vurmak" ("to knock on wood") is a physical gesture performed three times in quick succession, in reaction to actual or speculative bad news, as well as when giving and receiving praise, to protect against the evil eye. The knocks are often preceded with a gesture where the performer pulls their earlobe while making a short sound by inhaling through pursed lips. The gesture is usually accompanied by expressions such as "Allah korusun" ("God forbid", lit. "may God protect"), "maşallah" (from Arabic mashallah, lit. "God has willed it") or "nazar değmesin" (lit. may the evil eye not touch).
- In the United States in the 18th century, men used to knock on the wood stock of their muzzle-loading rifles to settle the black powder charge, ensuring the weapon would fire cleanly.
- In Russia, Estonia, and Ukraine, "Постучать по дереву" ("to knock on wood") has the same meaning. There is also an expression "Тфу тфу тфу" (Tfu tfu tfu) which represents the sound of spitting. A similar tradition is found in Assam in Northeast India, but with the difference that the person would have to "spit" with his head turned to the left shoulder which represents "spitting away" bad fortune because it is situated on the left (unstable) side of life.

== See also ==
- Alomancy, related to throwing salt over the left shoulder
- Crossed fingers
- Evil eye
- Jinx
