= Trochoid =

Curve traced by a circle rolling along a line

A cycloid (a common trochoid) generated by a rolling circle

In geometry, a trochoid (from Greek trochos 'wheel') is a roulette curve formed by a circle rolling along a line. It is the curve traced out by a point fixed to a circle (where the point may be on, inside, or outside the circle) as it rolls along a straight line. If the point is on the circle, the trochoid is called common (also known as a cycloid); if the point is inside the circle, the trochoid is curtate; and if the point is outside the circle, the trochoid is prolate. The word "trochoid" was coined by Gilles de Roberval, referring to the special case of a cycloid.

== Basic description ==
A prolate trochoid with b/a = 5/4

A curtate trochoid with b/a = 4/5

As a circle of radius a rolls without slipping along a line L, the center C moves parallel to L, and every other point P in the rotating plane rigidly attached to the circle traces the curve called the trochoid. Let C̅P̅ = b. Parametric equations of the trochoid for which L is the x-axis are
$$\begin{align}
x &= a\theta - b \sin \theta \\
y &= a - b \cos \theta
\end{align}$$
where θ is the variable angle through which the circle rolls.

=== Curtate, common, prolate ===
If P lies inside the circle (b < a), on its circumference (b = a), or outside (b > a), the trochoid is described as being curtate ("contracted"), common, or prolate ("extended"), respectively. A curtate trochoid is traced by a pedal (relative to the ground) when a normally geared bicycle is pedaled along a straight line. A prolate trochoid is traced by the tip of a paddle (relative to the water's surface) when a boat is driven with constant velocity by paddle wheels; this curve contains loops. A common trochoid, also called a cycloid, has cusps at the points where P touches the line L.

== General description ==
A more general approach would define a trochoid as the locus of a point $(x,y)$ orbiting at a constant rate around an axis located at $(x',y')$,

$$x=x'+r_1\cos(\omega_1 t+\phi_1),\ y=y'+r_1\sin(\omega_1 t+\phi_1),\ r_1>0,$$

which axis is being translated in the x-y-plane at a constant rate in either a straight line,

$$\begin{array}{lcl}
x'=x_0+v_{2x} t,\ y'=y_0+v_{2y} t\\
\therefore x = x_0+r_1\cos(\omega_1 t+\phi_1)+v_{2x} t,\ y = y_0+r_1 \sin(\omega_1 t+\phi_1)+v_{2y} t,\\
\end{array}$$

or a circular path (another orbit) around $(x_0,y_0)$ (the hypotrochoid/epitrochoid case),

$$\begin{array}{lcl}
x' = x_0+r_2\cos(\omega_2 t+\phi_2),\ y' = y_0+r_2\sin(\omega_2 t+\phi_2),\ r_2\ge 0\\
\therefore x = x_0+r_1\cos(\omega_1 t+\phi_1)+r_2\cos(\omega_2 t+\phi_2),\ y = y_0+r_1 \sin(\omega_1 t+\phi_1)+r_2\sin(\omega_2 t+\phi_2),\\
\end{array}$$

The ratio of the rates of motion and whether the moving axis translates in a straight or circular path determines the shape of the trochoid. In the case of a straight path, one full rotation coincides with one period of a periodic (repeating) locus. In the case of a circular path for the moving axis, the locus is periodic only if the ratio of these angular motions, $\omega_1/\omega_2$, is a rational number, say $p/q$, where $p$ & $q$ are coprime, in which case, one period consists of $p$ orbits around the moving axis and $q$ orbits of the moving axis around the point $(x_0,y_0)$. The special cases of the epicycloid and hypocycloid, generated by tracing the locus of a point on the perimeter of a circle of radius $r_1$ while it is rolled on the perimeter of a stationary circle of radius $R$, have the following properties:

$$\begin{array}{lcl}
\text{epicycloid: }&\omega_1/\omega_2&=p/q=r_2/r_1=R/r_1+1,\ |p-q| \text{ cusps}\\
\text{hypocycloid: }&\omega_1/\omega_2&=p/q=-r_2/r_1=-(R/r_1-1),\ |p-q|=|p|+|q| \text{ cusps}
\end{array}$$

where $r_2$ is the radius of the orbit of the moving axis. The number of cusps given above also hold true for any epitrochoid and hypotrochoid, with "cusps" replaced by either "radial maxima" or "radial minima".

== See also ==
- Aristotle's wheel paradox
- Brachistochrone
- Cyclogon
- Cycloid
- Epitrochoid
- Hypotrochoid
- List of periodic functions
- Roulette (curve)
- Spirograph
- Trochoidal wave
- Centered trochoid
