= Cyclocycloid =

The cyclocycloid (in this case an epicycloid) with R = 3, r = 1 and d = 1/2

A cyclocycloid is a roulette traced by a point attached to a circle of radius r rolling around, a fixed circle of radius R, where the point is at a distance d from the center of the exterior circle.

The red curve is a cyclocycloid (in this case an hypocycloid) drawn as the smaller black circle rolls around inside the larger blue circle (parameters are R = 5, r = -3, d = 5).

The parametric equations for a cyclocycloid are

$$x (\theta) = (R + r)\cos\theta - d\cos\left({R + r \over r}\theta\right),\,$$
$$y (\theta) = (R + r)\sin\theta - d\sin\left({R + r \over r}\theta\right).\,$$

where $\theta$ is a parameter (not the polar angle). And r can be positive (represented by a ball rolling outside of a circle) or negative (represented by a ball rolling inside of a circle) depending on whether it is of an epicycloid or hypocycloid variety.

The classic Spirograph toy traces out these curves.

== See also ==
- Centered trochoid
- Cycloid
- Epicycloid
- Hypocycloid
- Spirograph
