= Epitrochoid =

Plane curve formed by rolling a circle on the outside of another

The epitrochoid with R = 3, r = 1 and d = 1/2

In geometry, an epitrochoid (/ɛpɪˈtrɒkɔɪd/ or /ɛpɪˈtroʊkɔɪd/) is a roulette traced by a point attached to a circle of radius r rolling around the outside of a fixed circle of radius R, where the point is at a distance d from the center of the exterior circle.

The parametric equations for an epitrochoid are:

$$\begin{align}
& x (\theta) = (R + r)\cos\theta - d\cos\left({R + r \over r}\theta\right) \\
& y (\theta) = (R + r)\sin\theta - d\sin\left({R + r \over r}\theta\right)
\end{align}$$

The parameter θ is geometrically the polar angle of the center of the exterior circle. (However, θ is not the polar angle of the point $(x(\theta),y(\theta))$ on the epitrochoid.)

Special cases include the limaçon with R = r and the epicycloid with d = r.

The classic Spirograph toy traces out epitrochoid and hypotrochoid curves.

The paths of planets in the once popular geocentric system of deferents and epicycles are epitrochoids with $d>r,$ for both the outer planets and the inner planets.

The orbit of the Moon, when centered around the Sun, is approximated by an epitrochoid.

The combustion chamber of the Wankel engine is an epitrochoid.

== See also ==
- Cycloid
- Cyclogon
- Epicycloid
- Hypocycloid
- Hypotrochoid
- Spirograph
- List of periodic functions
- Rosetta (orbit)
- Apsidal precession
