= Roulette (curve) =

Mathematical curves generated by rolling other curves together

Cycloid - curve generated by a rotating point on a wheel

Epitrochoid - Wheel rotating around a wheel

In the differential geometry of curves, a roulette is a kind of kinematic curve, generalizing cycloids, epicycloids, hypocycloids, trochoids, epitrochoids, hypotrochoids, and involutes. On a basic level, it is the path traced by a curve while rolling on another curve without slipping.

== Definition ==
=== Informal definition ===
A green parabola rolls along an equal blue parabola which remains fixed. The generator is the vertex of the rolling parabola and describes the roulette, shown in red. In this case the roulette is the cissoid of Diocles.

Roughly speaking, a roulette is the curve described by a point (called the generator or pole) attached to a given curve as that curve rolls without slipping, along a second given curve that is fixed. More precisely, given a curve attached to a plane which is moving so that the curve rolls, without slipping, along a given curve attached to a fixed plane occupying the same space, then a point attached to the moving plane describes a curve in the fixed plane called a roulette.

=== Special cases and related concepts ===
In the case where the rolling curve is a line and the generator is a point on the line, the roulette is called an involute of the fixed curve. If the rolling curve is a circle and the fixed curve is a line then the roulette is a trochoid. If, in this case, the point lies on the circle then the roulette is a cycloid.

A related concept is a glissette, the curve described by a point attached to a given curve as it slides along two (or more) given curves.

=== Formal definition ===
Formally speaking, the curves must be differentiable curves in the Euclidean plane. The fixed curve is kept invariant; the rolling curve is subjected to a continuous congruence transformation such that at all times the curves are tangent at a point of contact that moves with the same speed when taken along either curve (another way to express this constraint is that the point of contact of the two curves is the instant centre of rotation of the congruence transformation). The resulting roulette is formed by the locus of the generator subjected to the same set of congruence transformations.

Modeling the original curves as curves in the complex plane, let $r,f:\mathbb R\to\Complex$ be the two natural parameterizations of the rolling ($r$) and fixed ($f$) curves, such that $r(0)=f(0)$, $r'(0) = f'(0)$, and $|r'(t)| = |f'(t)| \neq 0$ for all $t$. The roulette of generator $p\in\Complex$ as $r$ is rolled on $f$ is then given by the mapping:

$$t\mapsto f(t)+(p-r(t)) {f'(t)\over r'(t)}.$$

== Generalizations ==
If, instead of a single point being attached to the rolling curve, another given curve is carried along the moving plane, a family of congruent curves is produced. The envelope of this family may also be called a roulette.

Roulettes in higher spaces can certainly be imagined but one needs to align more than just the tangents.

== Example ==
If the fixed curve is a catenary and the rolling curve is a line, we have:

$$f(t)=t+i(\cosh(t)-1) \qquad r(t)=\sinh(t)$$

$$f'(t)=1+i\sinh(t) \qquad r'(t)=\cosh(t).$$

The parameterization of the line is chosen so that

$$|f'(t)| = \sqrt{1^2+\sinh^2(t)} = \sqrt{\cosh^2(t)} = |r'(t)|.$$

Applying the formula above we obtain:

$$f(t)+(p-r(t)){f'(t)\over r'(t)}
=t-i+{p-\sinh(t)+i(1+p\sinh(t))\over\cosh(t)}
=t-i+(p+i){1+i\sinh(t)\over\cosh(t)}.$$

If p = −i the expression has a constant imaginary part (namely −i) and the roulette is a horizontal line. An interesting application of this is that a square wheel could roll without bouncing on a road that is a matched series of catenary arcs.

== List of roulettes ==
Fixed curve	Rolling curve	Generating point	Roulette
Any curve	Line	Point on the line	Involute of the curve
Line	Any	Any	Cyclogon
Line	Circle	Any	Trochoid
Line	Circle	Point on the circle	Cycloid
Line	Conic section	Center of the conic	Sturm roulette
Line	Conic section	Focus of the conic	Delaunay roulette
Line	Parabola	Focus of the parabola	Catenary
Line	Ellipse	Focus of the ellipse	Elliptic catenary
Line	Hyperbola	Focus of the hyperbola	Hyperbolic catenary
Line	Rectangular hyperbola	Center of the hyperbola	Rectangular elastica
Line	Cyclocycloid	Center	Ellipse
Circle	Circle	Any	Centered trochoid
Outside of a circle	Circle	Any	Epitrochoid
Outside of a circle	Circle	Point on the circle	Epicycloid
Outside of a circle	Circle of identical radius	Any	Limaçon
Outside of a circle	Circle of identical radius	Point on the circle	Cardioid
Outside of a circle	Circle of half the radius	Point on the circle	Nephroid
Inside of a circle	Circle	Any	Hypotrochoid
Inside of a circle	Circle	Point on the circle	Hypocycloid
Inside of a circle	Circle of a third of the radius	Point on the circle	Deltoid
Inside of a circle	Circle of a quarter of the radius	Point on the circle	Astroid
Parabola	Equal parabola parameterized in opposite direction	Vertex of the parabola	Cissoid of Diocles
Catenary	Line	See example above	Line

== See also ==
- Gear
- Locus (mathematics)
- Rolling
- Rosetta (orbit)
- Spirograph
- Superposition principle
- Tusi couple
