= List of periodic functions =

This is a list of some well-known periodic functions. The constant function f (x) = c, where c is independent of x, is periodic with any period, but lacks a fundamental period. A definition is given for some of the following functions, though each function may have many equivalent definitions.

== Smooth functions ==
All trigonometric functions listed have period $2\pi$, unless otherwise stated. For the following trigonometric functions:

U_{n} is the nth up/down number,
B_{n} is the nth Bernoulli number
in Jacobi elliptic functions, $q=e^{-\pi \frac{K(1-m)}{K(m)}}$

Name	Symbol	Formula (Note: Formulae are given as Taylor series or derived from other entries.)	Fourier Series
Sine	$\sin(x)$	$\sum_{n=0}^\infty \frac{(-1)^n x^{2n+1}}{(2n + 1)!}$	$\sin(x)$
cas	$\operatorname{cas}(x)$	$\sin(x)+\cos(x)$	$\sin(x) + \cos(x)$
Cosine	$\cos(x)$	$\sum_{n=0}^\infty \frac{(-1)^n x^{2n}}{(2n)!}$	$\cos(x)$
cis	$e^{ix}, \operatorname{cis}(x)$	cos(x) + i sin(x)	$\cos(x)+i\sin(x)$
Tangent	$\tan(x)$	$\frac{\sin x}{\cos x}=\sum_{n=0}^\infty \frac{U_{2n+1} x^{2n+1}}{(2n+1)!}$	$2\sum_{n=1}^\infty (-1)^{n-1}\sin(2nx)$
Cotangent	$\cot(x)$	$\frac{\cos x}{\sin x}=\sum_{n=0}^\infty \frac{(-1)^n 2^{2n} B_{2n} x^{2n-1}}{(2n)!}$	$i+2i\sum_{n=1}^\infty(\cos2nx-i\sin2nx)$
Secant	$\sec(x)$	$\frac1{\cos x}=\sum_{n=0}^\infty \frac{U_{2n} x^{2n}}{(2n)!}$	-
Cosecant	$\csc(x)$	$\frac1{\sin x}=\sum_{n=0}^\infty \frac{(-1)^{n+1} 2 \left(2^{2n-1}-1\right) B_{2n} x^{2n-1}}{(2n)!}$	-
Exsecant	$\operatorname{exsec}(x)$	$\sec(x)-1$	-
Versine	$\operatorname{vers}(x)$	$1-\cos(x)$	$1-\cos(x)$
Coversine	$\operatorname{covers}(x)$	$1-\sin(x)$	$1-\sin(x)$
Haversine	$\operatorname{hav}(x)$	$\frac{1-\cos(x)}{2}$	$\frac{1}{2}-\frac12\cos(x)$
Jacobi elliptic function sn	$\operatorname{sn}(x,m)$	$\sin \operatorname{am}(x,m)$	$\frac{2\pi}{K(m)\sqrt m} \sum_{n=0}^\infty \frac{q^{n+1/2}}{1-q^{2n+1}}~\sin \frac{(2n+1)\pi x}{2K(m)}$
Jacobi elliptic function cn	$\operatorname{cn}(x,m)$	$\cos \operatorname{am}(x,m)$	$\frac{2\pi}{K(m)\sqrt m} \sum_{n=0}^\infty \frac{q^{n+1/2}}{1+q^{2n+1}}~\cos\frac{(2n+1)\pi x}{2K(m)}$
Jacobi elliptic function dn	$\operatorname{dn}(x,m)$	$\sqrt{1-m\operatorname{sn}^2(x,m)}$	$\frac{\pi}{2K(m)} + \frac{2\pi}{K(m)} \sum_{n=1}^\infty \frac{q^{n}}{1+q^{2n}}~\cos\frac{n\pi x}{K(m)}$
Jacobi elliptic function zn	$\operatorname{zn}(x,m)$	$\int^x_0\left[\operatorname{dn}(t,m)^2-\frac{E(m)}{K(m)}\right]dt$	$\frac{2\pi}{K(m)}\sum_{n=1}^\infty \frac{q^n}{1-q^{2n}}~\sin\frac{n\pi x}{K(m)}$
Weierstrass elliptic function	$\weierp(x,\Lambda)$	$\frac1{x^2}+\sum_{\lambda\in\Lambda-\{0\}}\left[\frac1{(x-\lambda)^2}-\frac1{\lambda^2}\right]$	{\displaystyle }
Clausen function	$\operatorname{Cl}_2(x)$	$-\int^x_0\ln\left|2\sin\frac{t}{2}\right|dt$	$\sum_{k=1}^\infty\frac{\sin kx}{k^2}$

== Non-smooth functions ==
The following functions have period $p$ and take $x$ as their argument. The symbol $\lfloor n \rfloor$ is the floor function of $n$ and $\sgn$ is the sign function.

K means Elliptic integral K(m)

Name	Formula	Limit	Fourier Series	Notes
Triangle wave	$\frac{4}{p} \left (x-\frac{p}{2} \left \lfloor\frac{2 x}{p}+\frac{1}{2} \right \rfloor \right )(-1)^\left \lfloor\frac{2 x}{p}+\frac{1}{2} \right \rfloor$	$\lim_{m\rightarrow1^-}\operatorname{zs}\left(\frac{4Kx}p-K,m\right)$	$\frac8{\pi^2}\sum_{n\,\mathrm{odd}}^{\infty} \frac{(-1)^{(n-1)/2}}{n^2} \sin\left(\frac{2\pi n x}{p}\right)$	non-continuous first derivative
Sawtooth wave	$2 \left( {\frac x p} - \left \lfloor {\frac 1 2} + {\frac x p} \right \rfloor \right)$	$-\lim_{m\rightarrow1^-}\operatorname{zn}\left(\frac{2Kx}p+K,m\right)$	$\frac2\pi\sum_{n=1}^\infty\frac{(-1)^{n-1}}n\sin\left(\frac{2\pi nx}{p}\right)$	non-continuous
Square wave	$\sgn\left(\sin \frac{2\pi x}{p} \right)$	$\lim_{m\rightarrow1^-}\operatorname{sn}\left(\frac{4Kx}p,m\right)$	$\frac4\pi\sum_{n\,\mathrm{odd}}^\infty\frac1n\sin\left(\frac{2\pi nx}{p}\right)$	non-continuous
Pulse wave	$H \left( \cos\frac{2\pi x}{p}- \cos\frac{\pi t}{p}\right)$ where $H$ is the Heaviside step function t is how long the pulse stays at 1		$\frac{t}{p} + \sum_{n=1}^{\infty} \frac{2}{n\pi} \sin\left(\frac{\pi nt}{p}\right) \cos\left(\frac{2\pi n x}{p}\right)$	non-continuous
Magnitude of sine wave with amplitude, A, and period, p/2	$A\left|\sin\frac{\pi x}p\right|$		$\frac{4A}{2\pi}+\sum_{n=1}^{\infty} \frac{4A}{\pi}\frac{1}{4n^2-1}\cos\frac{2\pi nx}p$	non-continuous
Cycloid	$\frac{p - p\cos \left( f^{(-1)}\left( \frac{2\pi x}{p} \right) \right)}{2\pi}$ given $f(x)=x-\sin(x)$ and $f^{(-1)}(x)$ is its real-valued inverse.		$\frac{p}{\pi} \biggl(\frac{3}4 + \sum_{n=1}^\infty \frac{\operatorname{J}_n(n)-\operatorname{J}_{n-1}(n)}n \cos\frac{2\pi nx}p\biggr)$ where $\operatorname{J}_n(x)$ is the Bessel Function of the first kind.	non-continuous first derivative
Dirac comb	$\sum_{n=-\infty}^{\infty}\delta(x-np)$	$\lim_{m\rightarrow1^-}\frac{2K(m)}{p\pi}\operatorname{dn}\left(\frac{2Kx}p,m\right)$	$\frac1p\sum_{n=-\infty}^{\infty}e^{\frac{2n\pi ix}p}$	non-continuous
Dirichlet function	$${\displaystyle \mathbf {1} _{\mathbb {Q} }(x)={\begin{cases}1&x\in \mathbb {Q} \\0&x\notin \mathbb {Q} \end{cases}}}$$	$\lim_{m,n\rightarrow\infty}\cos^{2m}(n!x\pi)$	-	non-continuous

== Vector-valued functions ==
- Epitrochoid
- Epicycloid (special case of the epitrochoid)
- Limaçon (special case of the epitrochoid)
- Hypotrochoid
- Hypocycloid (special case of the hypotrochoid)
- Spirograph (special case of the hypotrochoid)

== Doubly periodic functions ==
- Jacobi's elliptic functions
- Weierstrass's elliptic function
