= Tusi couple =

Mathematical device

An animated model of a Tusi couple

The Tusi couple (also known as Tusi's mechanism) is a mathematical device in which a small circle rotates inside a larger circle twice the diameter of the smaller circle. Rotations of the circles cause a point on the circumference of the smaller circle to oscillate back and forth in linear motion along a diameter of the larger circle. The Tusi couple is a two-cusped hypocycloid.

The couple was first proposed by the 13th-century Persian astronomer and mathematician Nasir al-Din al-Tusi in his 1247 Tahrir al-Majisti (Commentary on the Almagest) as a solution for the latitudinal motion of the inferior planets and later used extensively as a substitute for the equant introduced over a thousand years earlier in Ptolemy's Almagest.

== Original description ==
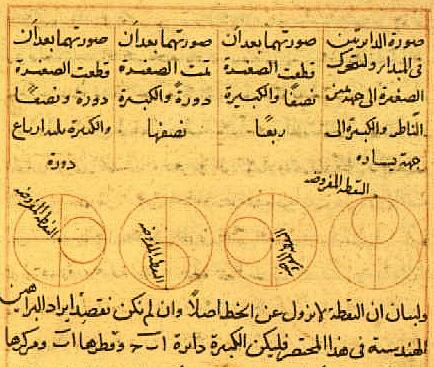
Tusi's diagram of the Tusi couple, 13th century

Tusi's two mutual inversions of the couple. Note that, contrary to the description, the circles in the lower animation must rotate in the same direction.

The translation of the copy of Tusi's original description of his geometrical model alludes to at least one inversion of the model to be seen in the diagrams:

If two coplanar circles, the diameter of one of which is equal to half the diameter of the other, are taken to be internally tangent at a point, and if a point is taken on the smaller circle—and let it be at the point of tangency—and if the two circles move with simple motions in opposite direction in such a way that the motion of the smaller [circle] is twice that of the larger so the smaller completes two rotations for each rotation of the larger, then that point will be seen to move on the diameter of the larger circle that initially passes through the point of tangency, oscillating between the endpoints.

Algebraically, the model can be expressed with complex numbers as

$$\left( 1-  \frac{1}{2} \right) e^{i \theta} - \frac{1}{2} e^{-i \theta} = i \, \sin \theta.$$

Other commentators have observed that the Tusi couple can be interpreted as a rolling curve where the rotation of the inner circle satisfies a no-slip condition as its tangent point moves along the fixed outer circle.

== Other sources ==
Copernicus' perception of the Tusi couple. "The two circles move ... in opposite direction."

The term "Tusi couple" is a modern one, coined by Edward Stewart Kennedy in 1966. It is one of several late Islamic astronomical devices bearing a striking similarity to models in Nicolaus Copernicus's De revolutionibus, including his Mercury model and his theory of trepidation. Historians suspect that Copernicus or another European author had access to an Arabic astronomical text, but an exact chain of transmission has not yet been identified. The 16th century scientist and traveler Guillaume Postel has been suggested as one possible facilitator.

Since the Tusi-couple was used by Copernicus in his reformulation of mathematical astronomy, there is a growing consensus that he became aware of this idea in some way. It has been suggested that the idea of the Tusi couple may have arrived in Europe leaving few manuscript traces, since it could have occurred without the translation of any Arabic text into Latin. One possible route of transmission may have been through Byzantine science; Gregory Chioniades translated some of al-Tusi's works from Arabic into Byzantine Greek. Several Byzantine Greek manuscripts containing the Tusi-couple are still extant in Italy. Another possibility is that he encountered the manuscript of the "Straightening of the Curves" (Sefer Meyasher 'Aqov) while studying in Italy.

While al-Tusi's model shows how a rectilinear motion can be obtained from two circular ones, Proclus's Commentary on the First Book of Euclid shows, on the contrary, how a cyclic motion can be obtained from two rectilinear ones. In his questiones on the Sphere (written before 1362), Nicole Oresme described how to combine circular motions to produce a reciprocating linear motion of a planet along the radius of its epicycle. Oresme's description is unclear and it is not certain whether this represents an independent invention or an attempt to come to grips with a poorly understood Arabic text.

== Later examples ==
Although the Tusi couple was developed within an astronomical context, later mathematicians and engineers developed similar versions of what came to be called hypocycloid straight-line mechanisms. The mathematician Gerolamo Cardano designed a system known as Cardan's movement (also known as a Cardan gear). Nineteenth-century engineers James White, Matthew Murray, as well as later designers, developed practical applications of the hypocycloid straight-line mechanism.

Goodman modification of the Tusi couple, using 3 spur gears

A practical and mechanically simple version of the Tusi couple, which avoids the use of an external rim gear, was developed in 2021 by John Goodman in order to provide linear motion. It uses 3 standard spur gears. A rotating (blue) arm is mounted on a central shaft, to which a fixed (yellow) gear is mounted. A (red) idler gear on the arm meshes with the fixed gear. A third (green) gear meshes with the idler. The third gear has half the number of teeth of the fixed gear. An (orange) arm is fixed to the third gear. If the length of the arm equals the distance between the fixed and outer gears = d, the arm will describe a straight line of throw = 2d. An advantage of this design is that, if standard modulus gears that do not provide the required throw, the idler gear does not have to be colinear with the other two gears

== Hypotrochoid ==
The ellipses (green, cyan, red) are hypotrochoids of the Tusi couple.

A property of the Tusi couple is that points on the inner circle that are not on the circumference trace ellipses. These ellipses, and the straight line traced by the classic Tusi couple, are special cases of hypotrochoids.

== See also ==
- Deltoid curve
- Epicyclic gearing
- Geometric lathe
- Guilloché
- Murray's Hypocycloidal Engine, utilising a Tusi couple as a substitute for crosshead guides or parallel motion
- Spirograph
- Straight-line mechanism
