= V1094 Tauri =

Eclipsing binary in the Taurus constellation

Observation data Epoch J2000 Equinox ICRS
- Constellation: Taurus
- A
- Right ascension: 04^{h} 12^{m} 03.59^{s}
- Declination: +21° 56′ 50.6″
- Apparent magnitude (V): 8.95 to 9.43
- B
- Right ascension: 04^{h} 12^{m} 05.10^{s}
- Declination: +21° 56′ 49.7″
- Apparent magnitude (V): 14.24

Characteristics

A
- Spectral type: G0 + G3
- Variable type: Algol

Astrometry

A
Proper motion (μ)	RA: +89.201 mas/yr Dec.: −84.886 mas/yr
Parallax (π)	8.2523±0.0203 mas
Distance	395.2 ± 1.0 ly (121.2 ± 0.3 pc)

B
Radial velocity (R_{v})	+5.67±2.98 km/s
Proper motion (μ)	RA: +88.757 mas/yr Dec.: −84.665 mas/yr
Parallax (π)	8.2126±0.0166 mas
Distance	397.1 ± 0.8 ly (121.8 ± 0.2 pc)

Orbit
Primary	eclipsing primary
Name	eclipsing secondary
Period (P)	8.988 d
Semi-major axis (a)	0.091—0.092 AU
Eccentricity (e)	0.2697
Inclination (i)	90°
Semi-amplitude (K_{1}) (primary)	65.30 km/s
Semi-amplitude (K_{2}) (secondary)	70.98 km/s

Details

Eclipsing primary
Mass	1.0965±0.0040 M_{☉}
Radius	1.4109±0.0058 R_{☉}
Temperature	5,850±100 K
Metallicity	−0.09±0.11 dex
Age	≈6 Gyr

Eclipsing secondary
Mass	1.0120±0.0028 M_{☉}
Radius	1.1063±0.0066 R_{☉}
Temperature	5,700±100 K
Metallicity	−0.09±0.11 dex
Age	≈6 Gyr

B
Mass	0.616 M_{☉}
Radius	0.636 R_{☉}
Luminosity	0.088 L_{☉}
Surface gravity (log g)	4.62 cgs
Temperature	3,944 K

Other designations
- V1094 Tau, AG+21 394, BD+21 605, HD 284195, SAO 76494, PPM 93323, CCDM J04121+2157, WDS J04121+2157, TYC 1263-642-1, GSC 01263-00642, 2MASS J04120358+2156508

Database references
SIMBAD	data
- B

V1094 Tauri is a system of at least three stars in the constellation of Taurus. Two stars are resolved 21″ apart; the brighter is an eclipsing binary. In 2015, the parameters for the eclipsing pair were precisely measured. Radial velocity data also revealed apsidal motion with a period of 14,500±3,700 years, which may indicate a third star.

The star system was included in a 2003 study that featured GK Draconis and V1094 Tauri. The study suggested a mass of 1.10 M_{☉} for the primary star and a mass of 1.01 M_{☉} for the secondary. The two stars orbit each other at a distance of around 0.091 to 0.092 astronomical units and have an orbital period of around 9 days.
