= Triangle wave =

Non-sinusoidal waveform

- A bandlimited triangle wave pictured in the time domain (top) and frequency domain (bottom). The fundamental is at 220 Hz (A_{3}).

General information
- General definition: $x(t) = 4 \left\vert t - \left\lfloor t + 3/4 \right\rfloor + 1/4 \right\vert - 1$
- Fields of application: Electronics, synthesizers

Domain, codomain and image
- Domain: $\mathbb{R}$
- Codomain: $\left[ -1, 1 \right]$

Basic features
- Parity: Odd
- Period: 1

Specific features
- Root: $\left\{ \tfrac{n}{2} \right\}, n \in \mathbb{Z}$
- Derivative: Square wave
- Fourier series: $x(t) = -\frac{8}{{\pi}^{2}}\sum_{k=1}^{\infty} \frac{{\left( -1 \right)}^{k}}{\left( 2 k - 1 \right)^{2}} \sin \left(2 \pi \left( 2 k - 1 \right) t\right)$

Triangle wave sound sample
5 seconds of triangle wave at 220 Hz

Additive Triangle wave sound sample
After each second, a harmonic is added to a sine wave creating a triangle 220 Hz wave

A triangular wave or triangle wave is a non-sinusoidal waveform named for its triangular shape. It is a periodic, piecewise linear, continuous real function.

Like a square wave, the triangle wave contains only odd harmonics. However, the higher harmonics roll off much faster than in a square wave (proportional to the inverse square of the harmonic number as opposed to just the inverse).

== Definitions ==
Sine, square, triangle, and sawtooth waveforms

=== Definition ===
A triangle wave of period p that spans the range [0, 1] is defined as
$$x(t) = 2 \left| \frac{t}{p} - \left\lfloor \frac{t}{p} + \frac{1}{2} \right\rfloor \right|,$$
where $\lfloor\ \rfloor$ is the floor function. This can be seen to be the absolute value of a shifted sawtooth wave.

For a triangle wave spanning the range [−1, 1] the expression becomes
$$x(t)= 2 \left | 2 \left( \frac{t}{p} - \left\lfloor \frac{t}{p} + \frac{1}{2} \right\rfloor \right) \right| - 1.$$

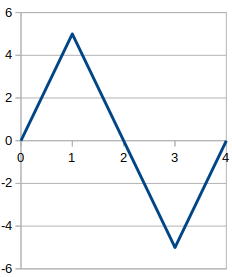
Triangle wave with amplitude = 5, period = 4

A more general equation for a triangle wave with amplitude $a$ and period $p$ using the modulo operation and absolute value is
$$y(x) = \frac{4a}{p} \left| \left( \left(x - \frac{p}{4}\right) \bmod p \right) - \frac{p}{2} \right| - a.$$

For example, for a triangle wave with amplitude 5 and period 4:
$$y(x) = 5 \left| \bigl( (x - 1) \bmod 4 \bigr) - 2 \right| - 5.$$

A phase shift can be obtained by altering the value of the $-p/4$ term, and the vertical offset can be adjusted by altering the value of the $-a$ term.

As this only uses the modulo operation and absolute value, it can be used to simply implement a triangle wave on hardware electronics.

Note that in many programming languages, the % operator is a remainder operator (with result the same sign as the dividend), not a modulo operator; the modulo operation can be obtained by using ((x % p) + p) % p in place of x % p. In e.g. JavaScript, this results in an equation of the form 4*a/p * Math.abs((((x - p/4) % p) + p) % p - p/2) - a.

=== Relation to the square wave ===
The triangle wave can also be expressed as the integral of the square wave:
$$x(t) = \int_0^t \sgn\left(\sin\frac{2 \pi u}{p}\right)\,du.$$

=== Expression in trigonometric functions ===
A triangle wave with period p and amplitude a can be expressed in terms of sine and arcsine (whose value ranges from −π/2 to π/2):
$$y(x) = \frac{2a}{\pi} \arcsin\left(\sin\left(\frac{2\pi}{p}x\right)\right).$$
The identity $\cos{x} = \sin\left(\frac{p}{4}-x\right)$ can be used to convert from a triangle "sine" wave to a triangular "cosine" wave. This phase-shifted triangle wave can also be expressed with cosine and arccosine:
$$y(x) = a - \frac{2a}{\pi} \arccos\left(\cos\left(\frac{2\pi}{p}x\right)\right).$$

=== Expressed as alternating linear functions ===
Another definition of the triangle wave, with range from −1 to 1 and period p, is
$$x(t) = \frac{4}{p} \left(t - \frac{p}{2} \left\lfloor\frac{2t}{p} + \frac{1}{2} \right\rfloor \right)(-1)^\left\lfloor\frac{2 t}{p} + \frac{1}{2} \right\rfloor.$$

=== Harmonics ===
Animation of the additive synthesis of a triangle wave with an increasing number of harmonics. See Fourier Analysis for a mathematical description.

It is possible to approximate a triangle wave with additive synthesis by summing odd harmonics of the fundamental while multiplying every odd harmonic by −1 (or, equivalently, changing its phase by π) and dividing the amplitude of the harmonics by the square of their mode number, n (which is equivalent to their relative frequency to the fundamental).

The above can be summarised mathematically as follows:
$$x_\text{triangle}(t) = \frac8{\pi^2} \sum_{i=0}^{N - 1} \frac{(-1)^i}{n^2} \sin(2\pi f_0 n t),$$
where N is the number of harmonics to include in the approximation, t is the independent variable (e.g. time for sound waves), $f_0$ is the fundamental frequency, and i is the harmonic label which is related to its mode number by $n = 2i + 1$.

This infinite Fourier series converges quickly to the triangle wave as N tends to infinity, as shown in the animation.

== Arc length ==
The arc length per period for a triangle wave, denoted by s, is given in terms of the amplitude a and period length p by
$$s = \sqrt{(4a)^2 + p^2}.$$

== See also ==
- List of periodic functions
- Sine wave
- Square wave
- Sawtooth wave
- Pulse wave
- Sound
- Triangle function
- Wave
- Zigzag
