= Caustic (mathematics) =

Envelope of rays either reflected or refracted by a manifold

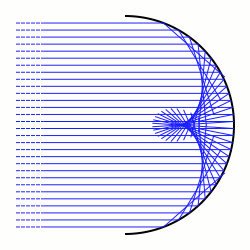
Reflective caustic generated from a circle and parallel rays. On one side, each point is contained in three light rays; on the other side, each point is contained in one light ray.

In differential geometry, a caustic is the envelope of rays either reflected or refracted by a manifold. It is related to the concept of caustics in geometric optics. The ray's source may be a point (called the radiant) or parallel rays from a point at infinity, in which case a direction vector of the rays must be specified.

More generally, especially as applied to symplectic geometry and singularity theory, a caustic is the critical value set of a Lagrangian mapping (π ∘ i) : L ↪ M ↠ B; where i : L ↪ M is a Lagrangian immersion of a Lagrangian submanifold L into a symplectic manifold M, and π : M ↠ B is a Lagrangian fibration of the symplectic manifold M. The caustic is a subset of the Lagrangian fibration's base space B.

== Explanation ==
The rays refracted by a non-flat surface form caustics where many of them cross.

Concentration of light, especially sunlight, can burn. The word caustic, in fact, comes from the Greek καυστός, burnt, via the Latin causticus, burning.

A common situation where caustics are visible is when light shines on a drinking glass. The glass casts a shadow, but also produces a curved region of bright light. In ideal circumstances (including perfectly parallel rays, as if from a point source at infinity), a nephroid-shaped patch of light can be produced. Rippling caustics are commonly formed when light shines through waves on a body of water.

Another familiar caustic is the rainbow. Scattering of light by raindrops causes different wavelengths of light to be refracted into arcs of differing radius, producing the bow.

== Catacaustic ==
A catacaustic is the reflective case.

With a radiant, it is the evolute of the orthotomic of the radiant.

The planar, parallel-source-rays case: suppose the direction vector is $(a,b)$ and the mirror curve is parametrised as $(u(t),v(t))$. The normal vector at a point is $(-v'(t),u'(t))$; the reflection of the direction vector is (normal needs special normalization)

$$2\mbox{proj}_nd-d=\frac{2n}{\sqrt{n\cdot n}}\frac{n\cdot d}{\sqrt{n\cdot n}}-d=2n\frac{n\cdot d}{n\cdot n}-d=\frac{
(av'^2-2bu'v'-au'^2,bu'^2-2au'v'-bv'^2)
}{v'^2+u'^2}$$

Having components of found reflected vector treat it as a tangent

$$(x-u)(bu'^2-2au'v'-bv'^2)=(y-v)(av'^2-2bu'v'-au'^2).$$

Using the simplest envelope form

$F(x,y,t)=(x-u)(bu'^2-2au'v'-bv'^2)-(y-v)(av'^2-2bu'v'-au'^2)$

$$=x(bu'^2-2au'v'-bv'^2)
-y(av'^2-2bu'v'-au'^2)
+b(uv'^2-uu'^2-2vu'v')
+a(-vu'^2+vv'^2+2uu'v')$$

$F_t(x,y,t)=2x(bu'u''-a(u'v''+u''v')-bv'v'') -2y(av'v''-b(u''v'+u'v'')-au'u'')$

$$+b( u'v'^2 +2uv'v'' -u'^3 -2uu'u'' -2u'v'^2 -2u''vv' -2u'vv'')
+a(-v'u'^2 -2vu'u'' +v'^3 +2vv'v'' +2v'u'^2 +2v''uu' +2v'uu'')$$

which may be unaesthetic, but $F=F_t=0$ gives a linear system in $(x,y)$ and so it is elementary to obtain a parametrisation of the catacaustic. Cramer's rule would serve.

=== Example ===
Let the direction vector be (0,1) and the mirror be $(t,t^2).$ Then

$u'=1$ $u''=0$ $v'=2t$ $v''=2$ $a=0$ $b=1$
$$F(x,y,t)=(x-t)(1-4t^2)+4t(y-t^2)=x(1-4t^2)+4ty-t$$
$$F_t(x,y,t)=-8tx+4y-1$$

and $F=F_t=0$ has solution $(0,1/4)$; i.e., light entering a parabolic mirror parallel to its axis is reflected through the focus.

== See also ==
- Alhazen's problem
- Cut locus (Riemannian manifold)
- Last geometric statement of Jacobi
- Nephroid caustic
