= Kahootz Toys =

American toy company

- Industry: Toy Company
- Founded: 2012
- Founder: Doug Cass; Colleen Loughman; Joe Yassay; Brent Oeschger
- Defunct: 2019
- Fate: Acquired by PlayMonster

Kahootz Toys was a toy company based in Ann Arbor, Michigan, best known for the relaunch of the classic toy Spirograph. Kahootz was founded in 2012 and acquired by PlayMonster in 2019.

== History ==
Kahootz founded in January 2012 by Doug Cass, Colleen Loughman, Joe Yassay, and Brent Oeschger after their previous company, Giddy Up, was sold. Kahootz' initial product offerings were Spirograph and Pomz. In a 2013 interview, Cass stated that they brought back the Spirograph because they saw an opportunity for success in the nostalgia market and felt that it would do well. The first shipment of Spirograph arrived just before Christmas in 2012.

The Spirograph (along with Kahootz' Lite-Brite) was exhibited at the 2013 Sweet Suite 13 show in Chicago, Illinois and the 2014 American International Toy Fair in New York City, New York. Since then, Kahootz Toys has expanded and released numerous new products and lines.

In 2019 Kahootz launched Y'Art™, a brand of craft kits that allows consumers to color-by-number with yarn. The craft kits were debuted at Toy Fair of the same year and led to the puppy kit winning the ASTRA Best Toys for Kids award in the Arts & Crafts: 7+ category.

Kahootz was acquired by PlayMonster in November 2019.

== Awards ==
| Award | Year | Product |
|---|---|---|
| ASTRA Best Toys for Kids | 2019 | Y'Art™ Craft Kit - Puppy |
| The Toy Insider Top Holiday Toys | 2016 | Spirograph Jr., Spirograph Shapes, Fashion Plates Superstar |
| The Toy Insider Top Spring and Summer Toys | 2016 | Fashion Plates Superstar |
| Cool Mom Picks Editor's Best | 2015 | Action Plates |
| ASTRA Best Toys for Kids | 2015 | Fashion Plates Deluxe Kit |
| The Toy Insider Top Holiday Toys | 2015 | Spirograph My Little Pony Design Set |
| EdPlay The Fabulous Award Runner-Up | 2015 | Original Spirograph Deluxe Set |
| Toy Industry Association Toy of the Year Finalist | 2014 | Original Spirograph Deluxe Set |
| ASTRA Best Toys for Kids | 2013 | Original Spirograph Deluxe Set |
