= Rosetta orbit =

Complex type of orbit

Example of an exaggerated Rosetta orbit

A Rosetta orbit is a complex type of orbit.

In astronomy, a Rosetta orbit occurs when there is a periastron shift during each orbital cycle. A retrograde Newtonian shift can occur when the central mass is extended rather than a point gravitational source, resulting in a non-closed orbit. A prograde relativistic shift happens because of relativistic effects from a massive gravitational source. In barred spiral galaxies with a compact, lens-shaped bar (in contrast with a box-shaped bar), the morphology of the bar is supported by stars following rosette-shaped orbits that rotate with the bar.

An object approaching a black hole with an intermediate velocity (not slow enough to spiral into the hole and not fast enough to escape) enters a complex orbit pattern, bounded by a near and far distance to the hole and tracing an oscillating pattern known as a hypotrochoid. In 2020, scientists using observations made by the European Southern Observatory's Very Large Telescope revealed for the first time that star S2 orbits in this pattern around Sagittarius A*.

In quantum mechanics, the Rosetta orbit is a solution for spherically symmetric (except 1/r) potentials.

== See also ==
- Apsidal precession
- Klemperer rosette
- Roulette (curve)
- Spirograph
