= Epicycloid =

Plane curve traced by a point on a circle rolled around another circle

The red curve is an epicycloid traced as the small circle (radius r = 1) rolls around the outside of the large circle (radius R = 3).

In geometry, an epicycloid (also called hypercycloid) is a plane curve produced by tracing the path of a chosen point on the circumference of a circle—called an epicycle—which rolls without slipping around a fixed circle. It is a particular kind of roulette.

An epicycloid with a minor radius (R2) of 0 is a circle. This is a degenerate form.

== Equations ==
If the rolling circle has radius $r$, and the fixed circle has radius $R = kr$, then the parametric equations for the curve can be given by either:

$$\begin{align}
& x (\theta) = (R + r) \cos \theta \ - r \cos \left( \frac{R + r}{r} \theta \right) \\
& y (\theta) = (R + r) \sin \theta \ - r \sin \left( \frac{R + r}{r} \theta \right)
\end{align}$$

or:

$$\begin{align}
& x (\theta) = r (k + 1) \cos \theta - r \cos \left( (k + 1) \theta \right) \\
& y (\theta) = r (k + 1) \sin \theta - r \sin \left( (k + 1) \theta \right).
\end{align}$$

This can be written in a more concise form using complex numbers as

$$z(\theta) = r \left( (k + 1)e^{ i\theta} - e^{i(k+1)\theta} \right)$$

where

- the angle $\theta \in [0, 2\pi],$
- the rolling circle has radius $r$, and
- the fixed circle has radius $kr$.

== Area and arc length ==
Assuming the initial point lies on the larger circle, when $k$ is a positive integer, the area $A$ and arc length $s$ of this epicycloid are

$$A=(k+1)(k+2)\pi r^2,$$
$$s=8(k+1)r.$$

It means that the epicycloid is $\frac{(k+1)(k+2)}{k^2}$ larger in area than the original stationary circle.

If $k$ is a positive integer, then the curve is closed, and has k cusps (i.e., sharp corners).

If $k$ is a rational number, say $k = p/q$ expressed as irreducible fraction, then the curve has $p$ cusps.

To close the curve and
complete the 1st repeating pattern :
θ = 0 to q rotations
α = 0 to p rotations
total rotations of outer rolling circle = p + q rotations

Count the animation rotations to see p and q

If $k$ is an irrational number, then the curve never closes, and forms a dense subset of the space between the larger circle and a circle of radius $R + 2r$.

The distance $\overline{OP}$ from the origin to the point $p$ on the small circle varies up and down as

$$R \leq \overline{OP} \leq R+2r$$

where

- $R$ = radius of large circle and
- $2r$ = diameter of small circle .
Epicycloid examples

k = 1; a cardioid

k = 2; a nephroid

k = 3; resembles a trefoil

k = 4; resembles a quatrefoil

k = 2.1 = 21/10

k = 3.8 = 19/5

k = 5.5 = 11/2

k = 7.2 = 36/5

The epicycloid is a special kind of epitrochoid.

An epicycle with one cusp is a cardioid, two cusps is a nephroid.

An epicycloid and its evolute are similar.

== Proof ==
sketch for proof

Assuming that the position of $p$ is what has to be solved, $\alpha$ is the angle from the tangential point to the moving point $p$, and $\theta$ is the angle from the starting point to the tangential point.

Since there is no sliding between the two cycles, then

$$\ell_R=\ell_r$$

By the definition of angle (which is the rate arc over radius), then

$$\ell_R= \theta R$$

and

$$\ell_r= \alpha r$$.

From these two conditions, the following identity is obtained

$$\theta R=\alpha r$$.

By calculating, the relation between $\alpha$ and $\theta$ is obtained, which is

$$\alpha =\frac{R}{r} \theta$$.

From the figure, the position of the point $p$ on the small circle is clearly visible.

$$x=\left( R+r \right)\cos \theta -r\cos\left( \theta+\alpha \right) =\left( R+r \right)\cos \theta -r\cos\left( \frac{R+r}{r}\theta \right)$$
$$y=\left( R+r \right)\sin \theta -r\sin\left( \theta+\alpha \right) =\left( R+r \right)\sin \theta -r\sin\left( \frac{R+r}{r}\theta \right)$$

== See also ==
Animated gif with turtle in MSWLogo (Cardioid)

- List of periodic functions
- Cycloid
- Cyclogon
- Deferent and epicycle
- Epicyclic gearing
- Epitrochoid
- Hypocycloid
- Hypotrochoid
- Multibrot set
- Roulette (curve)
- Spirograph
