= Hypotrochoid =

Curve traced by a point outside a circle rolling within another circle

The red curve is a hypotrochoid drawn as the smaller black circle rolls around inside the larger blue circle (parameters are R = 5, r = 3, d = 5).

In geometry, a hypotrochoid is a roulette traced by a point attached to a circle of radius r rolling around the inside of a fixed circle of radius R, where the point is a distance d from the center of the interior circle.

The parametric equations for a hypotrochoid are:

$$\begin{align}
& x (\theta) = (R - r)\cos\theta + d\cos\left({R - r \over r}\theta\right) \\
& y (\theta) = (R - r)\sin\theta - d\sin\left({R - r \over r}\theta\right)
\end{align}$$

where θ is the angle formed by the horizontal and the center of the rolling circle (these are not polar equations because θ is not the polar angle). When measured in radians, θ takes values from 0 to $2 \pi \times \tfrac{\operatorname{LCM}(r, R)}{R}$ (where LCM is least common multiple).

Special cases include the hypocycloid with d = r and the ellipse with R = 2r and d ≠ r. The eccentricity of the ellipse is

$$e=\frac{2\sqrt{d/r}}{1+(d/r)}$$

becoming 1 when $d=r$ (see Tusi couple).

The ellipse (drawn in red) may be expressed as a special case of the hypotrochoid, with R = 2r (Tusi couple); here R = 10, r = 5, d = 1.

The classic Spirograph toy traces out hypotrochoid and epitrochoid curves.

Hypotrochoids describe the support of the eigenvalues of some random matrices with cyclic correlations.

== See also ==
- Cycloid
- Cyclogon
- Epicycloid
- Rosetta (orbit)
- Apsidal precession
- Spirograph
