= Involute =

Curve traced by a string as it is unwrapped from another curve

Two involutes (red) of a parabola

An involute (also known as an evolvent) is a particular type of curve that is dependent on another shape or curve. An example of the involute of a curve is the locus of a point on a piece of taut string as the string is either unwrapped from or wrapped around the curve.

The evolute of an involute is the original curve.

It is generalized by the roulette family of curves. That is, the involutes of a curve are the roulettes of the curve generated by a straight line.

The notions of the involute and evolute of a curve were introduced into mathematics and physics by Christiaan Huygens in his work titled Horologium oscillatorium sive de motu pendulorum ad horologia aptato demonstrationes geometricae (1673), where he showed that the involute of a cycloid is still a cycloid, thus providing a method for constructing the cycloidal pendulum, which has the useful property that its period is independent of the amplitude of oscillation.

== Involute of a parameterized curve ==
Let $\vec c(t),\; t\in [t_1,t_2]$ be a regular curve in the plane with its curvature nowhere 0 and $a\in (t_1,t_2)$, then the curve with the parametric representation

$\vec C_a(t)=\vec c(t) -\frac{\vec c'(t)}{|\vec c'(t)|}\; \int_a^t|\vec c'(w)|\; dw$

is an involute of the given curve.

Proof
The string acts as a tangent to the curve $\vec c(t)$. Its length is changed by an amount equal to the arc length traversed as it winds or unwinds. Arc length of the curve traversed in the interval $[a,t]$ is given by

$\int_a^t|\vec c'(w)|\; dw$

where $a$ is the starting point from where the arc length is measured. Since the tangent vector depicts the taut string here, we get the string vector as

$\frac{\vec c'(t)}{|\vec c'(t)|}\; \int_a^t|\vec c'(w)|\; dw$

The vector corresponding to the end point of the string ($\vec C_a(t)$) can be easily calculated using vector addition, and one gets

$\vec C_a(t)=\vec c(t) -\frac{\vec c'(t)}{|\vec c'(t)|}\; \int_a^t|\vec c'(w)|\; dw$

Adding an arbitrary but fixed number $l_0$ to the integral $\Bigl(\int_a^t|\vec c'(w)|\; dw\Bigr)$ results in an involute corresponding to a string extended by $l_0$ (like a ball of wool yarn having some length of thread already hanging before it is unwound). Hence, the involute can be varied by constant $a$ and/or adding a number to the integral (see Involutes of a semicubic parabola).

If $\vec c(t)=(x(t),y(t))^T$ one gets

$$\begin{align}
X(t) &= x(t) - \frac{x'(t)}{\sqrt{x'(t)^2 + y'(t)^2}} \int_a^t \sqrt{x'(w)^2 + y'(w)^2} \,dw \\
Y(t) &= y(t) - \frac{y'(t)}{\sqrt{x'(t)^2 + y'(t)^2}} \int_a^t \sqrt{x'(w)^2 + y'(w)^2} \,dw \; .
\end{align}$$

== Properties of involutes ==
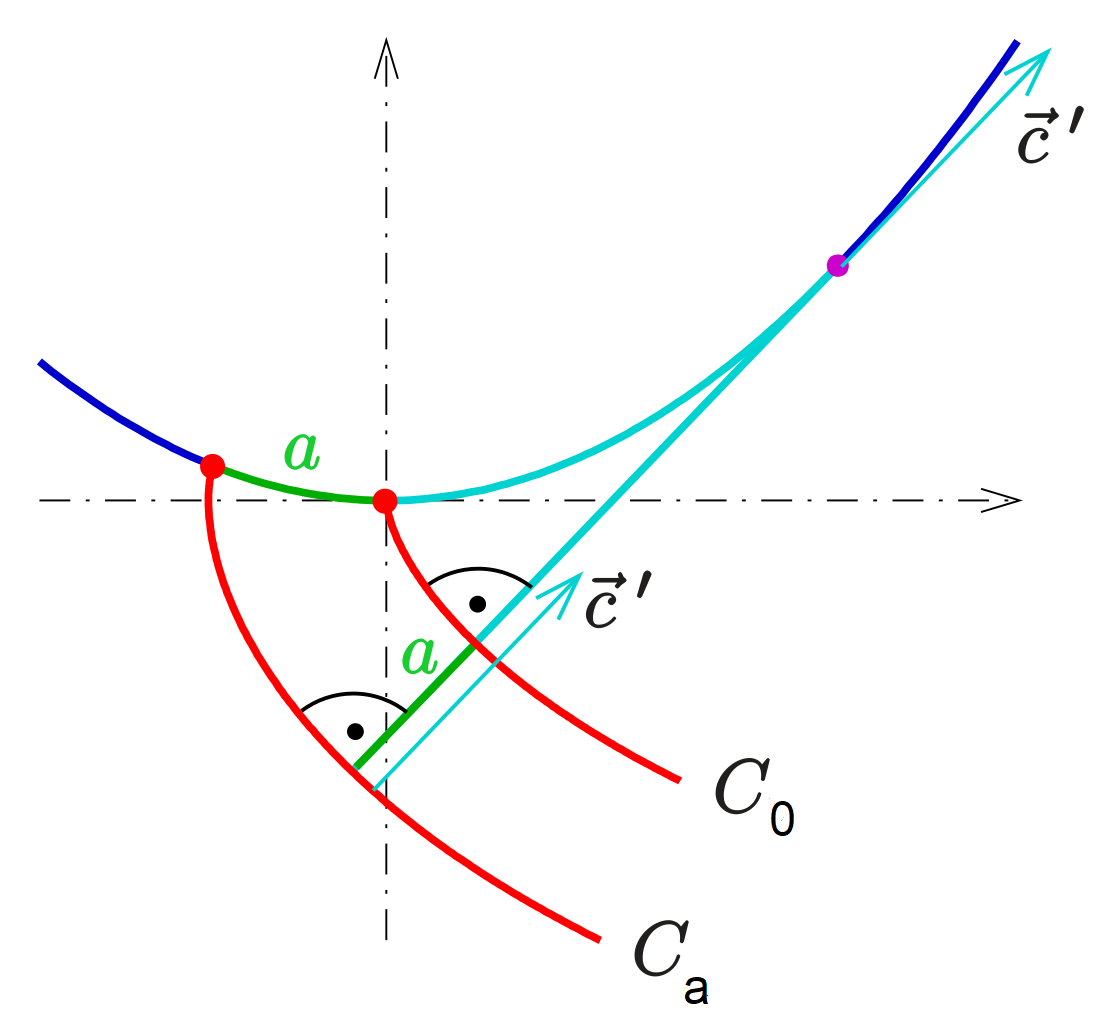
Involute: properties. The angles depicted are 90 degrees.

In order to derive properties of a regular curve it is advantageous to suppose the arc length $s$ to be the parameter of the given curve, which lead to the following simplifications: $\;|\vec c'(s)|=1\;$ and $\;\vec c''(s)=\kappa(s)\vec n(s)\;$, with $\kappa$ the curvature and $\vec n$ the unit normal. One gets for the involute:

$\vec C_a(s)=\vec c(s) -\vec c'(s)(s-a)\$ and
$$\vec C_a'(s)=-\vec c''(s)(s-a)=-\kappa(s)\vec n(s)(s-a)\;$$

and the statement:

- At point $\vec C_a(a)$ the involute is not regular (because $| \vec C_a'(a)|=0$ ),

and from $\; \vec C_a'(s)\cdot\vec c'(s)=0 \;$ follows:

- The normal of the involute at point $\vec C_a(s)$ is the tangent of the given curve at point $\vec c(s)$.
- The involutes are parallel curves, because of $\vec C_a(s)=\vec C_0(s)+a\vec c'(s)$ and the fact, that $\vec c'(s)$ is the unit normal at $\vec C_0(s)$.

The family of involutes and the family of tangents to the original curve makes up an orthogonal coordinate system. Consequently, one may construct involutes graphically. First, draw the family of tangent lines. Then, an involute can be constructed by always staying orthogonal to the tangent line passing the point.

=== Cusps ===
This section is based on work by Huygens and Barrow.

There are generically two types of cusps in involutes. The first type is at the point where the involute touches the curve itself. This is a cusp of order 3/2. The second type is at the point where the curve has an inflection point. This is a cusp of order 5/2.

This can be visually seen by constructing a map $f: \R^2 \to \R^3$ defined by
$$(s, t) \mapsto (x(s) + t\cos(\theta), y(s) + t\sin(\theta), t)$$
where $(x(s), y(s))$ is the arclength parametrization of the curve, and $\theta$ is the slope-angle of the curve at the point $(x(s), y(s))$. This maps the 2D plane into a surface in 3D space. For example, this maps the circle into the hyperboloid of one sheet.

By this map, the involutes are obtained in a three-step process: map $\R$ to $\R^2$, then to the surface in $\R^3$, then project it down to $\R^2$ by removing the z-axis:
$$s \mapsto (s, l- s) \mapsto f(s, l- s) \mapsto (f(s, l- s)_x, f(s, l- s)_y)$$
where $l$ is any real constant.

Since the mapping $s \mapsto f(s, l-s)$ has nonzero derivative at all $s\in \R$, cusps of the involute can only occur where the derivative of $s \mapsto f(s, l-s)$ is vertical (parallel to the z-axis), which can only occur where the surface in $\R^3$ has a vertical tangent plane.

Generically, the surface has vertical tangent planes at only two cases: where the surface touches the curve, and where the curve has an inflection point.

==== cusp of order 3/2 ====
For the first type, one can start by the involute of a circle, with equation
$$\begin{align}
X(t) &= r(\cos t + (t - a)\sin t)\\
Y(t) &= r(\sin t - (t - a)\cos t)
\end{align}$$
then set $a = 0$, and expand for small $t$, to obtain
$$\begin{align}
X(t) &= r + r t^2/2 + O(t^4)\\
Y(t) &= rt^3/3 + O(t^5)
\end{align}$$
thus giving the order 3/2 curve $Y^2 - \frac{8}{9r} (X-r)^{3} + O(Y^{8/3}) = 0$, a semicubical parabola.

==== cusp of order 5/2 ====
Tangents and involutes of the cubic curve $y = x^3$. The cusps of order 3/2 are on the cubic curve, while the cusps of order 5/2 are on the x-axis (the tangent line at the inflection point).

For the second type, consider the curve $y = x^3$. The arc from $x= 0$ to $x = s$ is of length $\int_0^s \sqrt{1 + (3t^2)^2}dt = s + \frac{9}{10} s^5 - \frac 98 s^9 + O(s^{13})$, and the tangent at $x = s$ has angle $\theta = \arctan(3s^2)$. Thus, the involute starting from $x= 0$ at distance $L$ has parametric formula
$$\begin{cases}
x(s) = s + (L-s-\frac{9}{10}s^5 + \cdots)\cos\theta \\
y(s) = s^3 + (L-s-\frac{9}{10}s^5 + \cdots)\sin\theta
\end{cases}$$
Expand it up to order $s^5$, we obtain
$$\begin{cases}
x(s) = L - \frac 92 L s^4 + (\frac 92 L - \frac{9}{10}) s^5 + O(s^6)\\
y(s) = 3Ls^2 - 2 s^3 + O(s^6)
\end{cases}$$
which is a cusp of order 5/2. Explicitly, one may solve for the polynomial expansion satisfied by $x, y$:
$$\left(x - L + \frac{y^2}{2L} \right)^2 - \left(\frac 92 L + \frac{51}{10} \right)^2 \left(\frac{y}{3L} \right)^5 + O(s^{11}) = 0$$
or
$$x = L - \frac{y^2}{2L} \pm \left(\frac 92 L + \frac{51}{10} \right) \left(\frac{y}{3L} \right)^{2.5} + O(y^{2.75}),\quad \quad y \geq 0$$
which clearly shows the cusp shape.

Setting $L=0$, we obtain the involute passing the origin. It is special as it contains no cusp. By serial expansion, it has parametric equation
$$\begin{cases}
x(s) = \frac{18}{5} s^5 - \frac{126}{5} s^9 + O(s^{13}) \\
y(s) = -2s^3 + \frac{54}{5} s^7 - \frac{318}{5} s^{11} + O(s^{15})
\end{cases}$$
or $x = -\frac{18}{5 \cdot 2^{1/3}}y^{5/3} + O(y^3)$

== Examples ==
=== Involutes of a circle ===
Involutes of a circle

For a circle with parametric representation $(r\cos(t), r\sin(t))$, one has $\vec c'(t) = (-r\sin t, r\cos t)$. Hence $|\vec c'(t)| = r$, and the path length is $r(t - a)$.

Evaluating the above given equation of the involute, one gets

$$\begin{align}
X(t) &= r(\cos (t+a) + t\sin (t+a))\\
Y(t) &= r(\sin (t+a) - t\cos (t+a))
\end{align}$$

for the parametric equation of the involute of the circle.

The $a$ term is optional; it serves to set the start location of the curve on the circle. The figure shows involutes for $a = -0.5$ (green), $a = 0$ (red), $a = 0.5$ (purple) and $a = 1$ (light blue). The involutes look like Archimedean spirals, but they are actually not.

The arc length for $a=0$ and $0 \le t \le t_2$ of the involute is

$$L = \frac{r}{2} t_2^2.$$

Involutes of a semicubic parabola (blue). Only the red curve is a parabola. Notice how the involutes and tangents make up an orthogonal coordinate system. This is a general fact.

=== Involutes of a semicubic parabola ===
The parametric equation $\vec c(t) = (\tfrac{t^3}{3}, \tfrac{t^2}{2})$ describes a semicubical parabola. From $\vec c'(t) = (t^2, t)$ one gets $|\vec c'(t)| = t\sqrt{t^2 + 1}$ and $\int_0^t w\sqrt{w^2 + 1}\,dw = \frac{1}{3}\sqrt{t^2 + 1}^3 - \frac13$. Extending the string by $l_0={1\over3}$ extensively simplifies further calculation, and one gets

$$\begin{align} X(t)&= -\frac{t}{3}\\
Y(t) &= \frac{t^2}{6} - \frac{1}{3}.\end{align}$$

Eliminating t yields $Y = \frac{3}{2}X^2 - \frac{1}{3},$ showing that this involute is a parabola.

The other involutes are thus parallel curves of a parabola, and are not parabolas, as they are curves of degree six (See Parallel curve § Further examples).

The red involute of a catenary (blue) is a tractrix.

=== Involutes of a catenary ===
For the catenary $(t, \cosh t)$, the tangent vector is $\vec c'(t) = (1, \sinh t)$, and, as $1 + \sinh^2 t =\cosh^2 t,$ its length is $|\vec c'(t)| = \cosh t$. Thus the arc length from the point (0, 1) is $\textstyle\int_0^t \cosh w\,dw = \sinh t.$

Hence the involute starting from (0, 1) is parametrized by

$$(t - \tanh t, 1/\cosh t),$$

and is thus a tractrix.

The other involutes are not tractrices, as they are parallel curves of a tractrix.

=== Involutes of a cycloid ===
Involutes of a cycloid (blue): Only the red curve is another cycloid

The parametric representation $\vec c(t) = (t - \sin t, 1 - \cos t)$ describes a cycloid. From $\vec c'(t) = (1 - \cos t, \sin t)$, one gets (after having used some trigonometric formulas)

$$|\vec c'(t)| = 2\sin\frac{t}{2},$$

and

$$\int_\pi^t 2\sin\frac{w}{2}\,dw = -4\cos\frac{t}{2}.$$

Hence the equations of the corresponding involute are

$$X(t) = t + \sin t,$$
$$Y(t) = 3 + \cos t,$$

which describe the shifted red cycloid of the diagram. Hence

- The involutes of the cycloid $(t - \sin t, 1 - \cos t)$ are parallel curves of the cycloid

$$(t + \sin t, 3 + \cos t).$$

(Parallel curves of a cycloid are not cycloids.)

== Involute and evolute ==
The evolute of a given curve $c_0$ consists of the curvature centers of $c_0$. Between involutes and evolutes the following statement holds:

A curve is the evolute of any of its involutes.

Involute and evolute
Tractrix (red) as an involute of a catenary

The evolute of a tractrix is a catenary

== Application ==
The most common profiles of modern gear teeth are involutes of a circle. In an involute gear system, the teeth of two meshing gears contact at a single instantaneous point that follows along a single straight line of action. The forces the contacting teeth exert on each other also follow this line and are normal to the teeth. The involute gear system maintaining these conditions follows the fundamental law of gearing: the ratio of angular velocities between the two gears must remain constant throughout.

With teeth of other shapes, the relative speeds and forces rise and fall as successive teeth engage, resulting in vibration, noise, and excessive wear. For this reason, nearly all modern planar gear systems are either involute or the related cycloidal gear system.

Mechanism of a scroll compressor

The involute of a circle is also an important shape in gas compressing, as a scroll compressor can be built based on this shape. Scroll compressors make less sound than conventional compressors and have proven to be quite efficient.

The High Flux Isotope Reactor uses involute-shaped fuel elements, since these allow a constant-width channel between them for coolant.

== See also ==
- Envelope (mathematics)
- Evolute
- Goat grazing problem
- Involute gear
- Roulette (curve)
- Scroll compressor
