= Cyclogon =

Curve traced by a vertex of a polygon as it rolls

In geometry, a cyclogon is the curve traced by a vertex of a regular polygon that rolls without slipping along a straight line.

In the limit, as the number of sides increases to infinity, the cyclogon becomes a cycloid.

The cyclogon has an interesting property regarding its area. Let A denote the area of the region above the line and below one of the arches, let P denote the area of the rolling polygon, and let C denote the area of the disk that circumscribes the polygon. For every cyclogon generated by a regular polygon,

$$A = P + 2C. \,$$

== Examples ==
=== Cyclogons generated by an equilateral triangle and a square ===
Animation showing the generation of one arch of a cyclogon by an equilateral triangle as the triangle rolls over a straight line without slipping.	Animation showing the generation of one arch of a cyclogon by a square as the square rolls over a straight line without slipping.

=== Prolate cyclogon generated by an equilateral triangle ===
Animation showing the tracing of a prolate cyclogon as an equilateral triangle rolls over a straight line without skipping. The tracing point X is outside the disk of the triangle.

=== Curtate cyclogon generated by an equilateral triangle ===
Animation showing the tracing of a curtate cyclogon as an equilateral triangle rolls over a straight line without skipping. The tracing point Y is inside the disk of the triangle.

=== Cyclogons generated by quadrilaterals ===
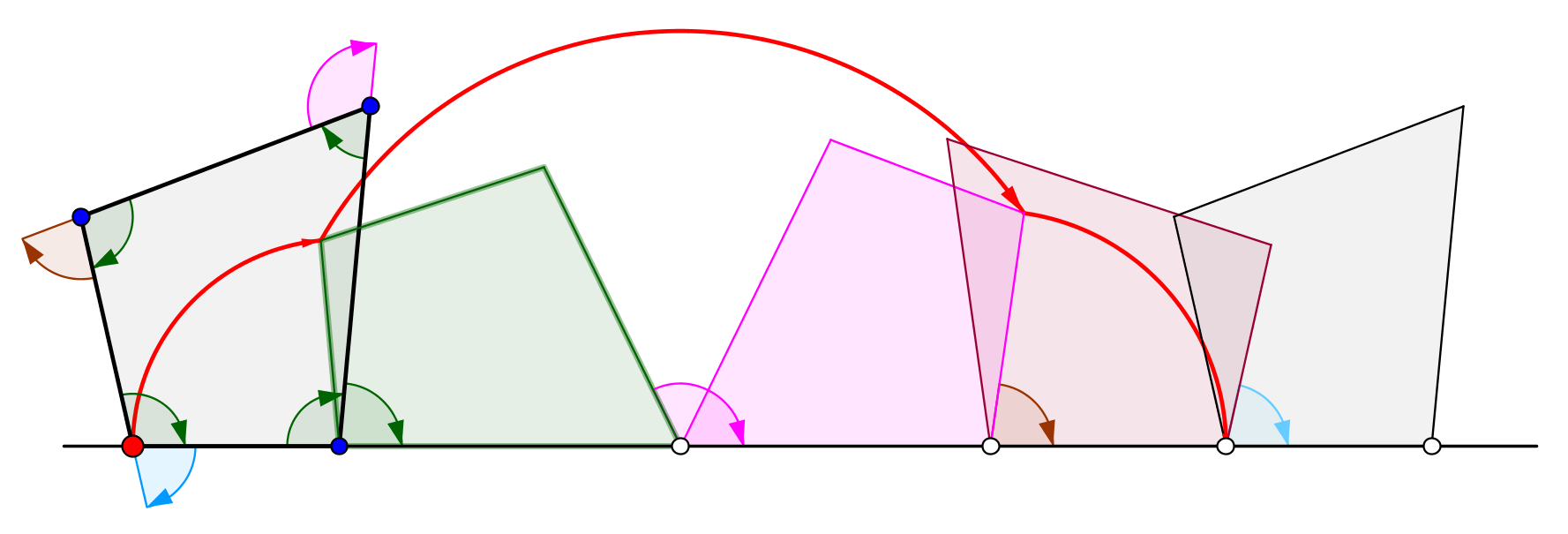
Cyclogon generated by a convex quadrilateral

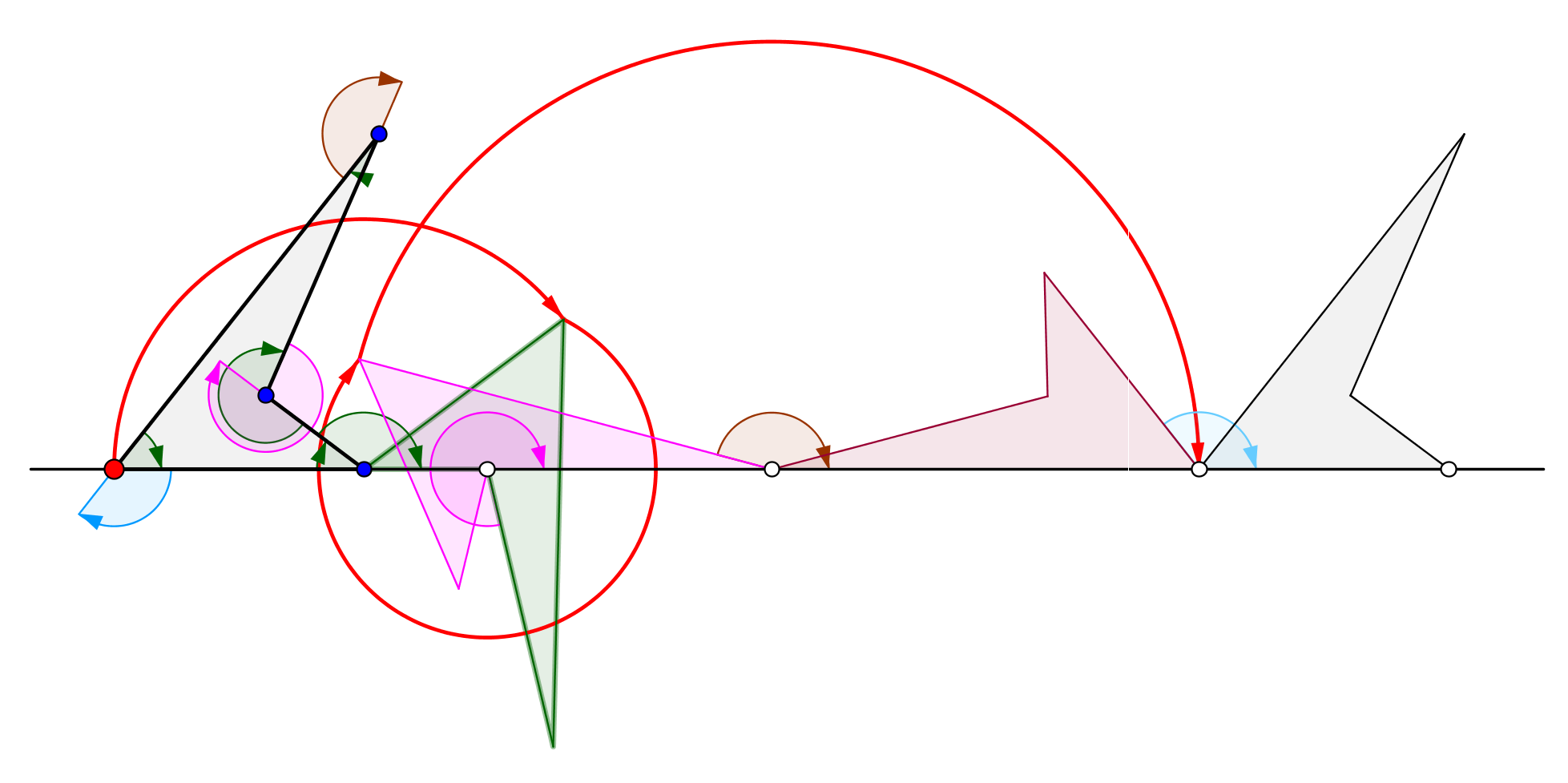
Cyclogon generated by a non-convex quadrilateral

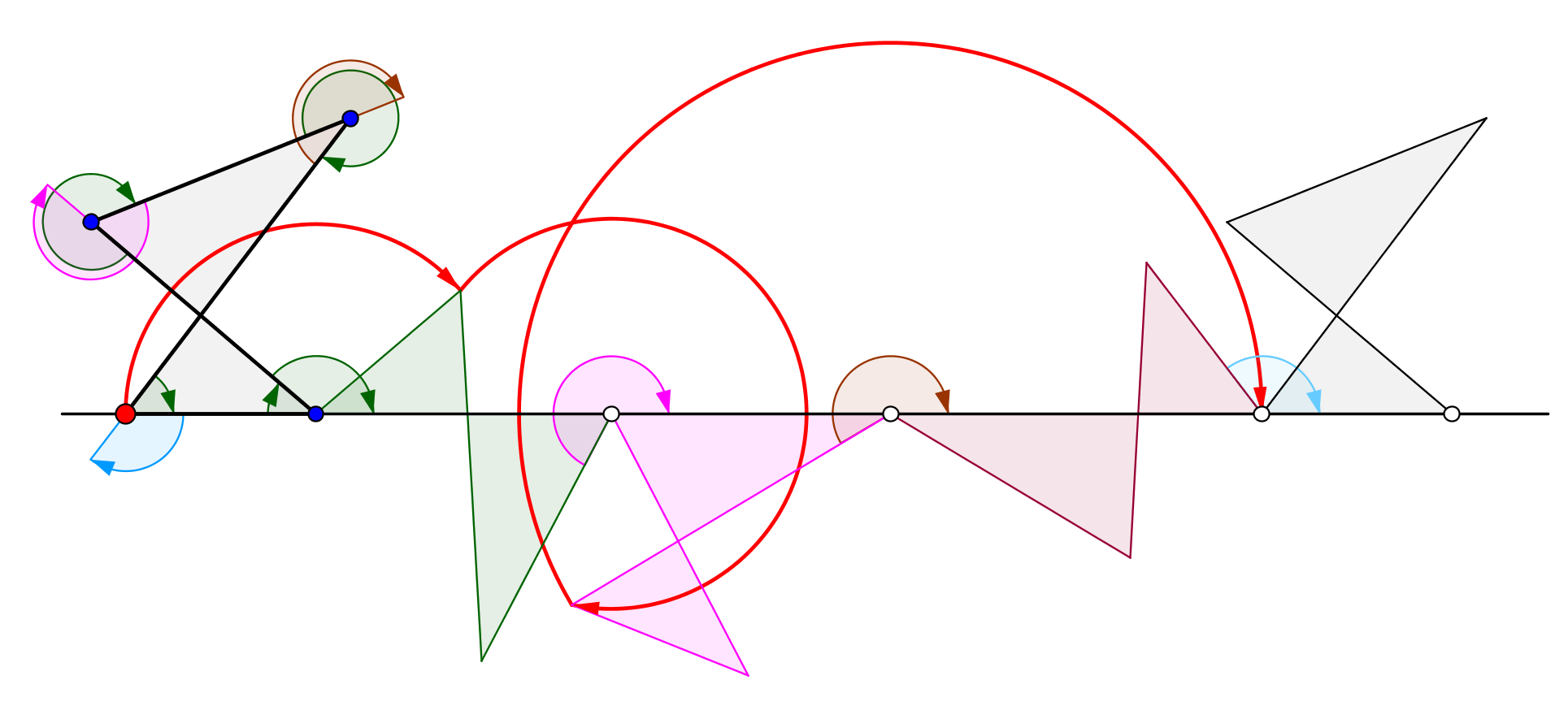
Cyclogon generated by a star-like quadrilateral

== Generalized cyclogons ==
A cyclogon is obtained when a polygon rolls over a straight line. Let it be assumed that the regular polygon rolls over the edge of another polygon. Let it also be assumed that the tracing point is not a point on the boundary of the polygon but possibly a point within the polygon or outside the polygon but lying in the plane of the polygon. In this more general situation, let a curve be traced by a point z on a regular polygonal disk with n sides rolling around another regular polygonal disk with m sides. The edges of the two regular polygons are assumed to have the same length. A point z attached rigidly to the n-gon traces out an arch consisting of n circular arcs before repeating the pattern periodically. This curve is called a trochogon — an epitrochogon if the n-gon rolls outside the m-gon, and a hypotrochogon if it rolls inside the m-gon. The trochogon is curtate if z is inside the n-gon, and prolate (with loops) if z is outside the n-gon. If z is at a vertex it traces an epicyclogon or a hypocyclogon.

== See also ==
- Cycloid
- Epicycloid
- Hypocycloid
