= Spirograph =

Geometric drawing device

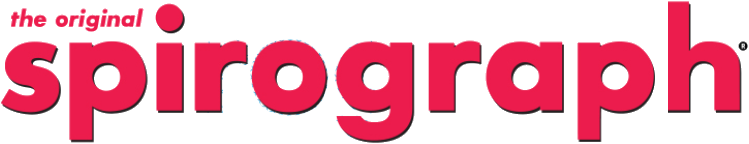
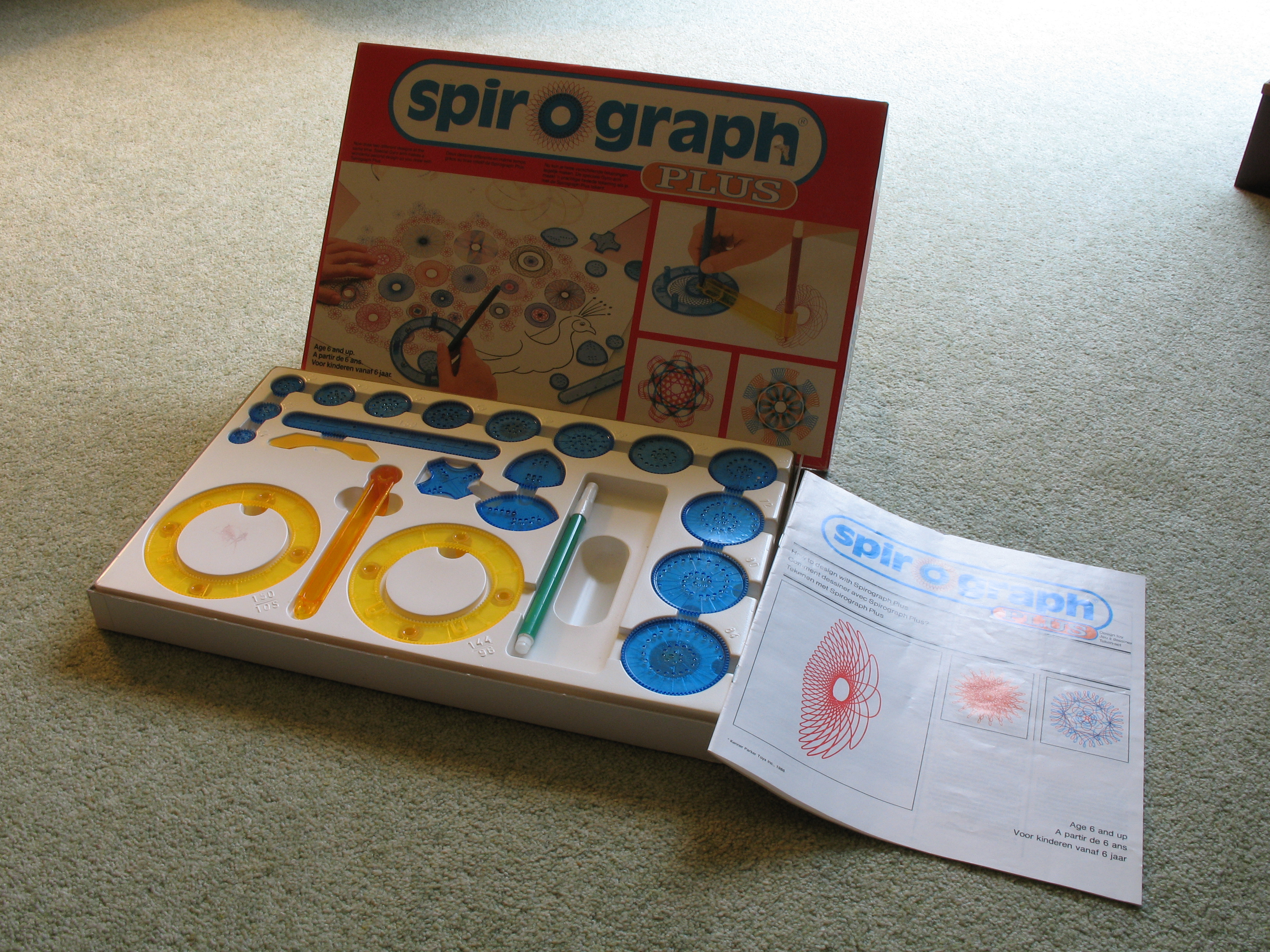
- Spirograph set
- Invented by: Denys Fisher
- Company: Hasbro
- Country: United Kingdom
- Availability: 1965–present
- Materials: Plastic
- Official website

Spirograph is a geometric drawing device that produces mathematical roulette curves of the variety technically known as hypotrochoids and epitrochoids. The well-known toy version was developed by British engineer Denys Fisher and first sold in 1965.

The name has been a registered trademark of Hasbro Inc. since 1998 following purchase of the company that had acquired the Denys Fisher company. The Spirograph brand was relaunched worldwide in 2013, with its original product configurations, by Kahootz Toys.

== History ==
In 1827, Greek-born English architect and engineer Peter Hubert Desvignes developed and advertised a "Speiragraph", a device to create elaborate spiral drawings. A man named J. Jopling soon claimed to have previously invented similar methods. When working in Vienna between 1845 and 1848, Desvignes constructed a version of the machine that would help prevent banknote forgeries, as any of the nearly endless variations of roulette patterns that it could produce were extremely difficult to reverse engineer. The mathematician Bruno Abakanowicz invented a new Spirograph device between 1881 and 1900. It was used for calculating an area delimited by curves.

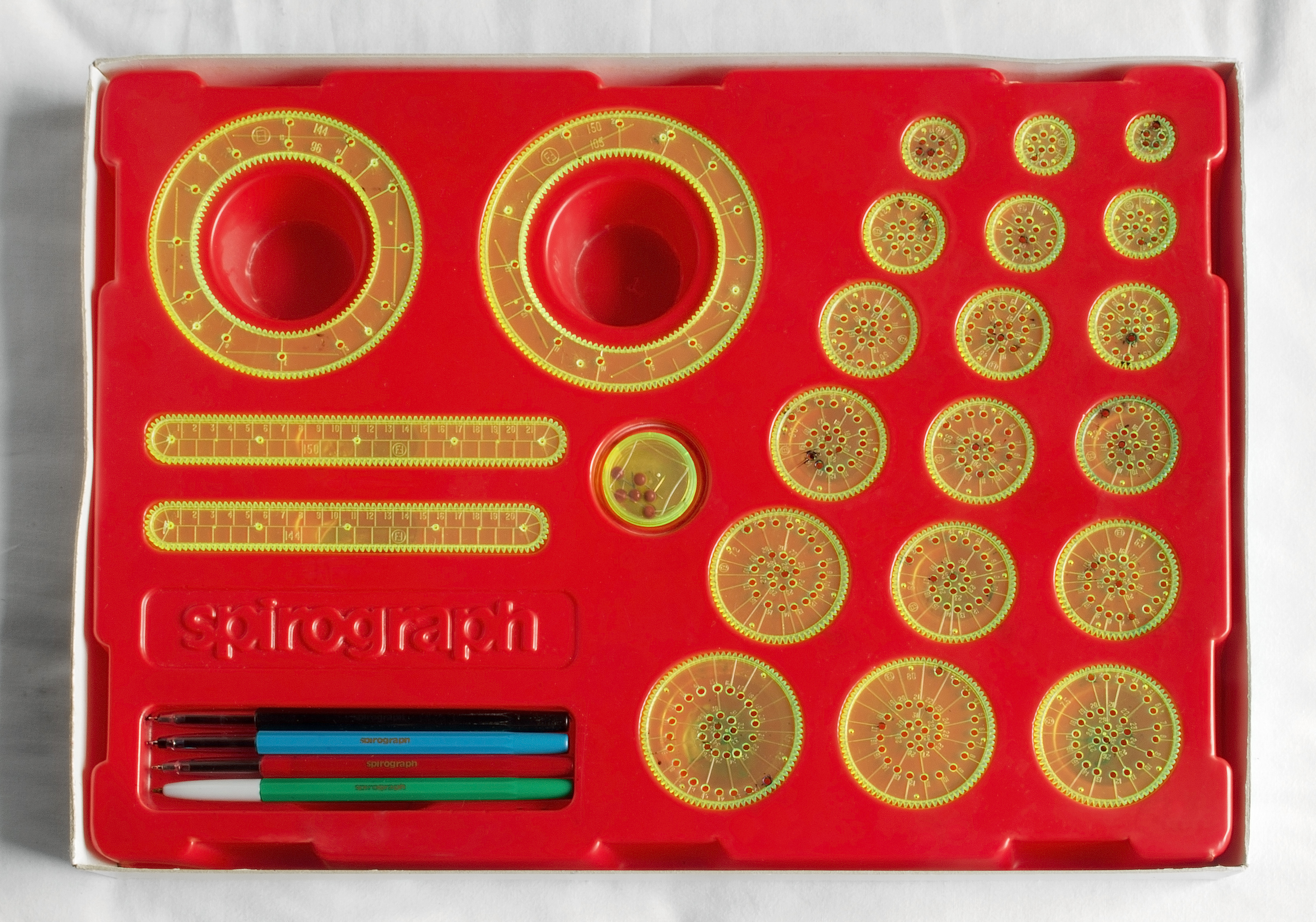
Spirograph set (UK Palitoy early 1980s)

Drawing toys based on gears have been around since at least 1908, when The Marvelous Wondergraph was advertised in the Sears catalog. An article describing how to make a Wondergraph drawing machine appeared in the Boys Mechanic publication in 1913.

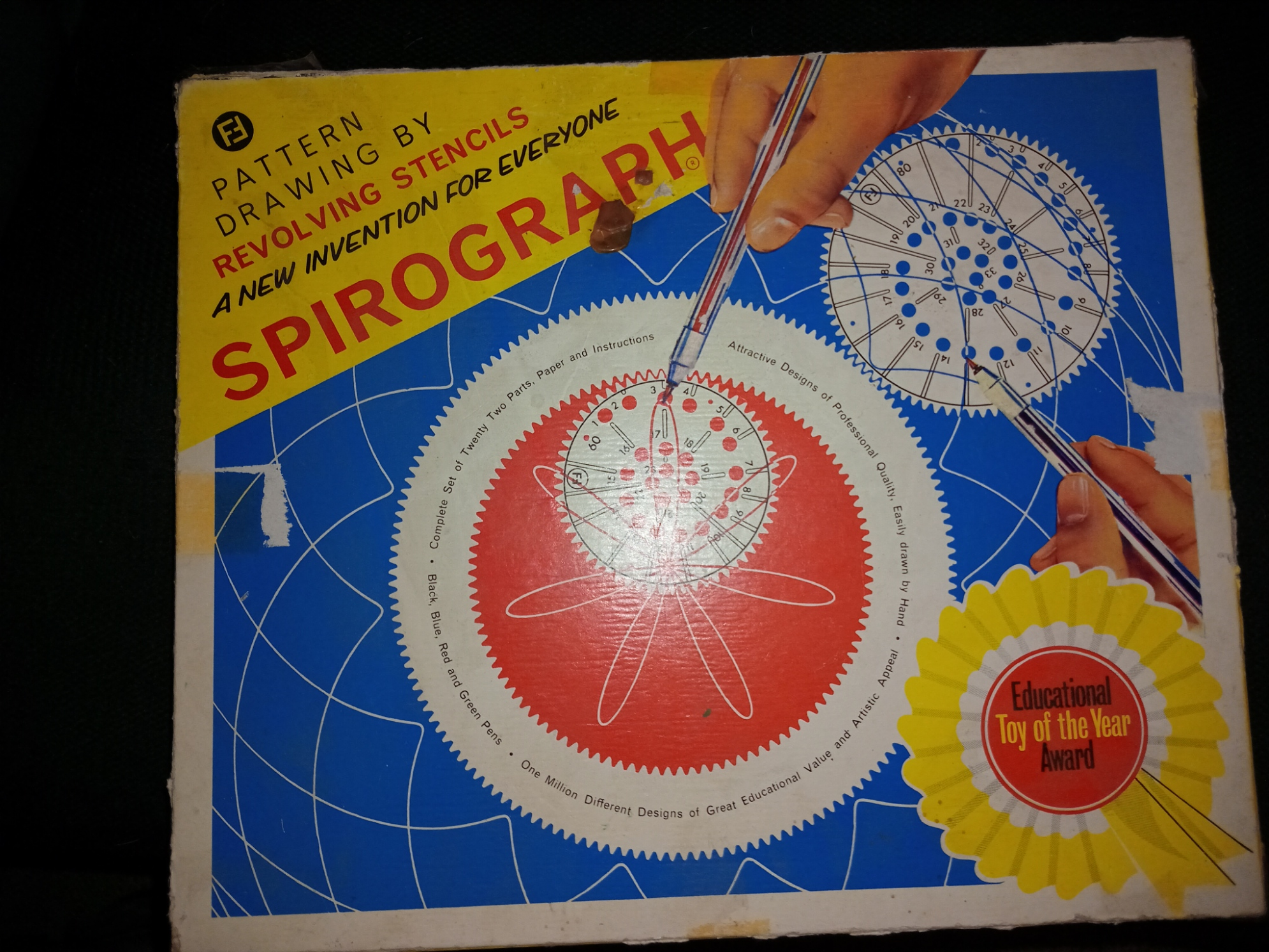
Early Spirograph box

The definitive Spirograph toy was developed by the British engineer Denys Fisher between 1962 and 1964 by creating drawing machines with Meccano pieces. Fisher exhibited his spirograph at the 1965 Nuremberg International Toy Fair. It was subsequently produced by his company. US distribution rights were acquired by Kenner, Inc., which introduced it to the United States market in 1966 and promoted it as a creative children's toy. Kenner later introduced Spirotot, Magnetic Spirograph, Spiroman, and various refill sets.

In 2013 the Spirograph brand was re-launched worldwide, with the original gears and wheels, by Kahootz Toys. The modern products use removable putty in place of pins to hold the stationary pieces in place. The Spirograph was Toy of the Year in 1967, and Toy of the Year finalist, in two categories, in 2014. Kahootz Toys was acquired by PlayMonster LLC in 2019.

== Operation ==
The original US-released Spirograph consisted of two differently sized plastic rings (or stators), with gear teeth on both the inside and outside of their circumferences. Once either of these rings were held in place (either by pins, with an adhesive, or by hand) any of several provided gearwheels (or rotors)—each having holes for a ballpoint pen—could be spun around the ring to draw geometric shapes. Later, the Super-Spirograph introduced additional shapes such as rings, triangles, and straight bars. All edges of each piece have teeth to engage any other piece; smaller gears fit inside the larger rings, but they also can rotate along the rings' outside edge or even around each other. Gears can be combined in many different arrangements. Sets often included variously colored pens, which could enhance a design by switching colors, as seen in the examples shown here.

Animation of a Spirograph

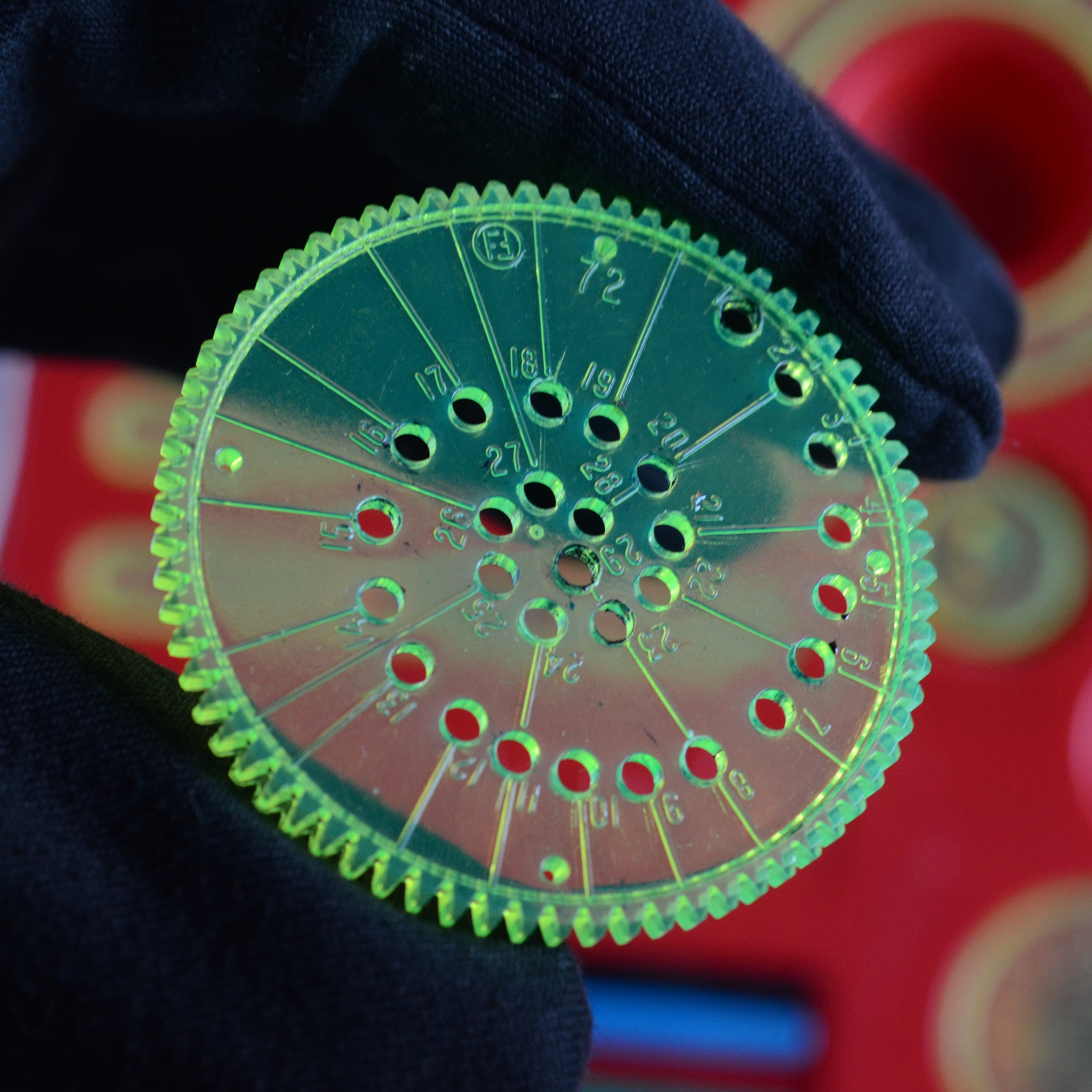
Closeup of a Spirograph wheel

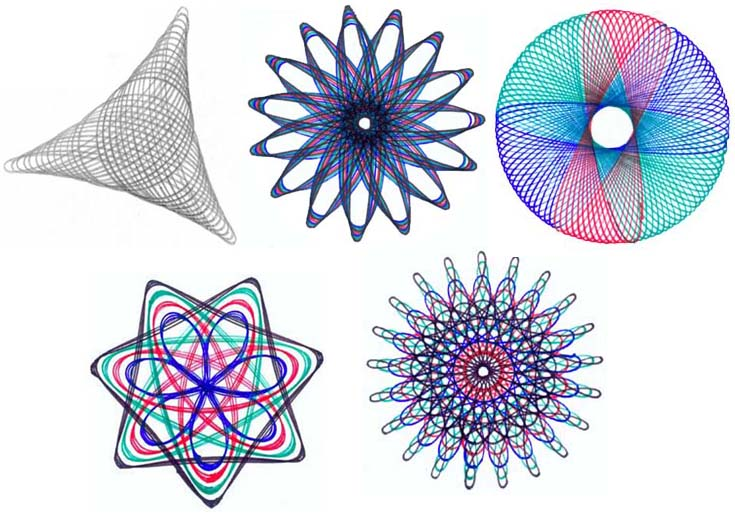
Several Spirograph designs drawn with a Spirograph set using several different-colored pens

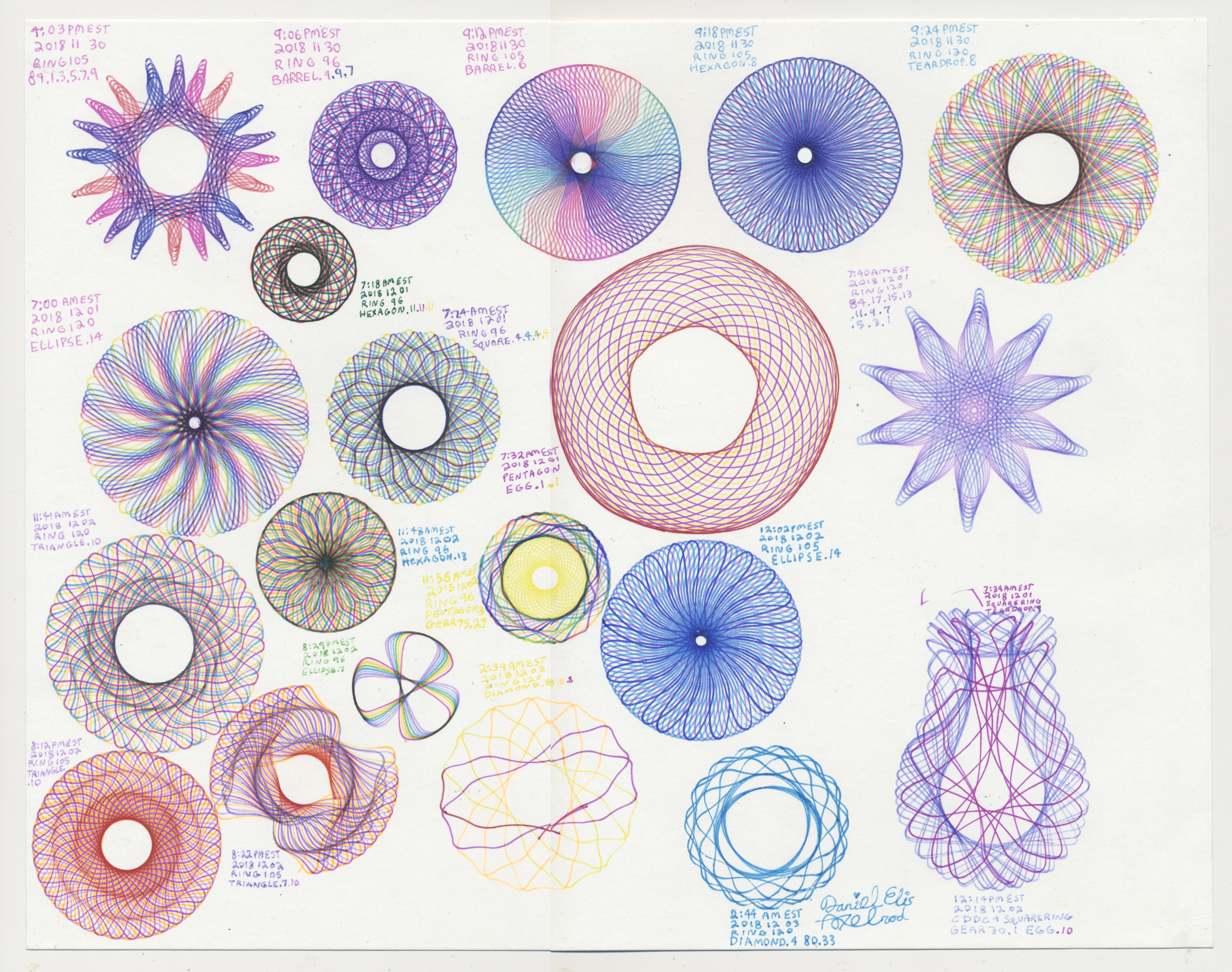

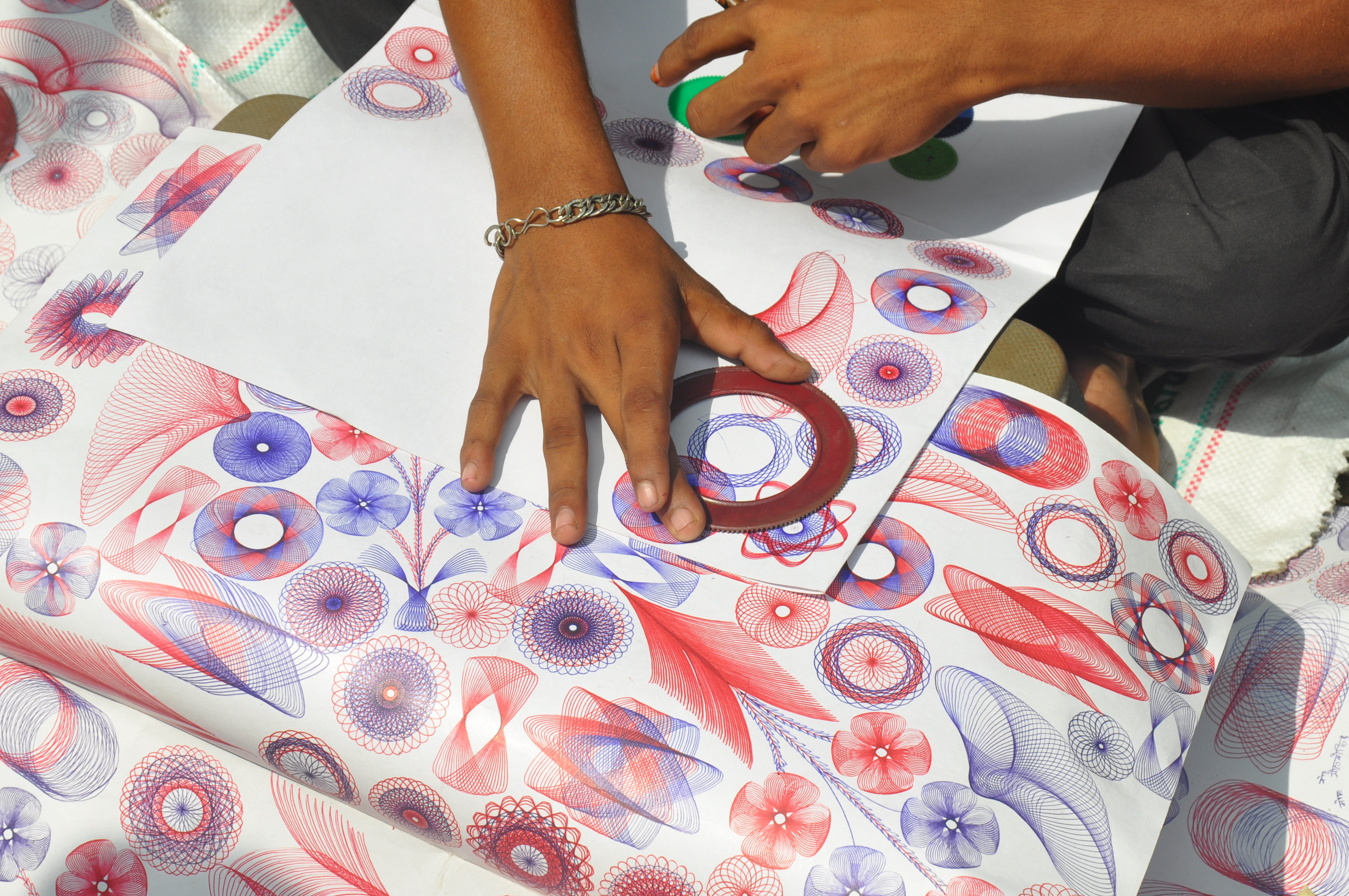
Drawing patterns with a
Spirograph ring and wheel

== Mathematical basis ==
Geometric construction for mathematical explanation of spirograph

Consider a fixed outer circle $C_o$ of radius $R$ centered at the origin. A smaller inner circle $C_i$ of radius $r < R$ is rolling inside $C_o$ and is continuously tangent to it. $C_i$ will be assumed never to slip on $C_o$ (in a real Spirograph, teeth on both circles prevent such slippage). Now assume that a point $A$ lying somewhere inside $C_i$ is located a distance $\rho<r$ from $C_i$'s center. This point $A$ corresponds to the pen-hole in the inner disk of a real Spirograph. Without loss of generality it can be assumed that at the initial moment the point $A$ was on the $X$ axis. In order to find the trajectory created by a Spirograph, follow point $A$ as the inner circle is set in motion.

Now mark two points $T$ on $C_o$ and $B$ on $C_i$. The point $T$ always indicates the location where the two circles are tangent. Point $B$, however, will travel on $C_i$, and its initial location coincides with $T$. After setting $C_i$ in motion counterclockwise around $C_o$, $C_i$ has a clockwise rotation with respect to its center. The distance that point $B$ traverses on $C_i$ is the same as that traversed by the tangent point $T$ on $C_o$, due to the absence of slipping.

Now define the new (relative) system of coordinates $(X', Y')$ with its origin at the center of $C_i$ and its axes parallel to $X$ and $Y$. Let the parameter $t$ be the angle by which the tangent point $T$ rotates on $C_o$, and $t'$ be the angle by which $C_i$ rotates (i.e. by which $B$ travels) in the relative system of coordinates. Because there is no slipping, the distances traveled by $B$ and $T$ along their respective circles must be the same, therefore

$$tR = (t - t')r,$$

or equivalently,

$$t' = -\frac{R - r}{r} t.$$

It is common to assume that a counterclockwise motion corresponds to a positive change of angle and a clockwise one to a negative change of angle. A minus sign in the above formula ($t' < 0$) accommodates this convention.

Let $(x_c, y_c)$ be the coordinates of the center of $C_i$ in the absolute system of coordinates. Then $R - r$ represents the radius of the trajectory of the center of $C_i$, which (again in the absolute system) undergoes circular motion thus:

$$\begin{align}
x_c &= (R - r)\cos t,\\
y_c &= (R - r)\sin t.
\end{align}$$

As defined above, $t'$ is the angle of rotation in the new relative system. Because point $A$ obeys the usual law of circular motion, its coordinates in the new relative coordinate system $(x', y')$ are

$$\begin{align}
x' &= \rho\cos t',\\
y' &= \rho\sin t'.
\end{align}$$

In order to obtain the trajectory of $A$ in the absolute (old) system of coordinates, add these two motions:

$$\begin{align}
x &= x_c + x' = (R - r)\cos t + \rho\cos t',\\
y &= y_c + y' = (R - r)\sin t + \rho\sin t',\\
\end{align}$$

where $\rho$ is defined above.

Now, use the relation between $t$ and $t'$ as derived above to obtain equations describing the trajectory of point $A$ in terms of a single parameter $t$:

$$\begin{align}
x &= x_c + x' = (R - r)\cos t + \rho\cos \frac{R - r}{r}t,\\
y &= y_c + y' = (R - r)\sin t - \rho\sin \frac{R - r}{r}t\\
\end{align}$$

(using the fact that function $\sin$ is odd).

It is convenient to represent the equation above in terms of the radius $R$ of $C_o$ and dimensionless parameters describing the structure of the Spirograph. Namely, let

$$l = \frac{\rho}{r}$$

and

$$k = \frac{r}{R}.$$

The parameter $0 \le l \le 1$ represents how far the point $A$ is located from the center of $C_i$. At the same time, $0 \le k \le 1$ represents how big the inner circle $C_i$ is with respect to the outer one $C_o$.

It is now observed that

$$\frac{\rho}{R} = lk,$$

and therefore the trajectory equations take the form

$$\begin{align}
x(t) &= R\left[(1 - k)\cos t + lk\cos \frac{1 - k}{k}t\right],\\
y(t) &= R\left[(1 - k)\sin t - lk\sin \frac{1 - k}{k}t\right].\\
\end{align}$$

Parameter $R$ is a scaling parameter and does not affect the structure of the Spirograph. Different values of $R$ would yield similar Spirograph drawings.

The two extreme cases $k = 0$ and $k = 1$ result in degenerate trajectories of the Spirograph. In the first extreme case, when $k = 0$, we have a simple circle of radius $R$, corresponding to the case where $C_i$ has been shrunk into a point. (Division by $k = 0$ in the formula is not a problem, since both $\sin$ and $\cos$ are bounded functions.)

The other extreme case $k = 1$ corresponds to the inner circle $C_i$'s radius $r$ matching the radius $R$ of the outer circle $C_o$, i.e. $r = R$. In this case the trajectory is a single point. Intuitively, $C_i$ is too large to roll inside the same-sized $C_o$ without slipping.

If $l = 1$, then the point $A$ is on the circumference of $C_i$. In this case the trajectories are called hypocycloids and the equations above reduce to those for a hypocycloid.

== See also ==
- Apsidal precession – Rotation of a celestial body's orbital line of apsides
- Cardioid – Type of plane curve
- Cyclograph – Instrument for drawing arcs of large diameter with no clear center
- Geometric lathe – Engraving device
- Guilloché – Decorative technique
- Harmonograph – Device using pendulums to create images
