= Engine turning =

Decorative technique

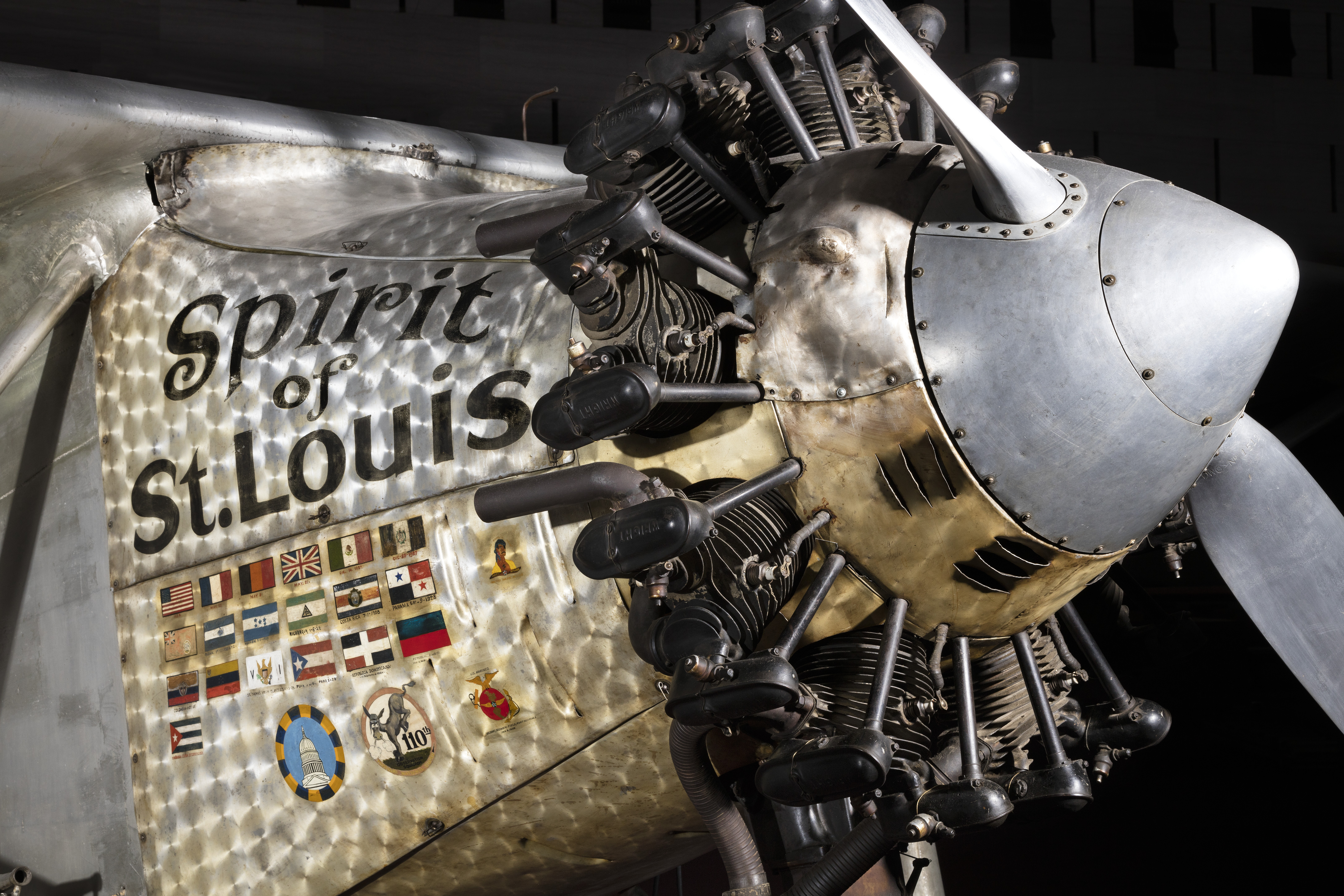
Charles Lindbergh's famous aircraft, the Spirit of St. Louis. The perlée pattern on the metal panels is one type of engine turning.

Engine turning is a form of ornamental turning. The finishing technique may use lathes or engines to produce a pattern. Aluminium is often the metal chosen to decorate. The technique has been used in various industries, including aircraft and document verification.

== Description ==
Engine turning is a form of ornamental turning. The technique geometrically applies a single-point cutting tool to produce a decorative metal surface finish pattern.

Traditionally, engine turning referred to Guilloché engraving. In the 20th century, it also came to refer to the different process of Perlée (also known as spotting, jewelling, perlage), which is a fine geometric pattern of overlapping circles abraded onto the surface.

=== Equipment ===
Guilloché engine turning may be done with various machines, including rose engines, straight-line engines, brocade engines, and ornamental turning lathes. Perlage uses an abrasive rotating disk or dowel.

=== Material ===
Aluminium is often the metal chosen to decorate with jewelling, but many hard surfaces can be finely machined to produce intricate repetitive patterns that offer reflective interest and fine detail.

== Uses ==
=== Aircraft ===
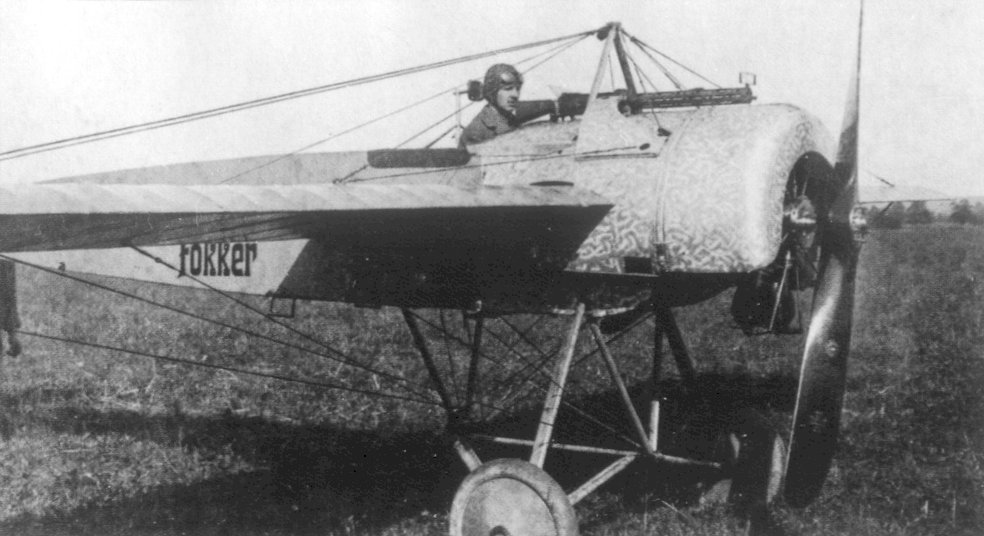
A Fokker E.II of late 1915, with "dragged" engine turning on the engine cowl and associated sheet metal.

Perlée-style engine turning was used on the sheet metal panels of the engine cowling (nose) of Charles Lindbergh's aircraft, the Spirit of St. Louis.

The sheet metal parts of the World War I Fokker Eindecker fighters aircraft series, especially around the engine cowl and associated sheet metal, are noted for having a "dragged" form of engine turning entirely covering them. The tool creating the "swirls" was repeatedly moved along a short, irregular path each time while pressed against the metal, to create the intricate appearance that was characteristic of the aircraft's sheet-metal parts. It is partly surmised to have been a mechanical method to "clad" a duralumin-alloy sheet-metal panel with a layer of pure aluminum, for corrosion protection.

=== Automobiles ===
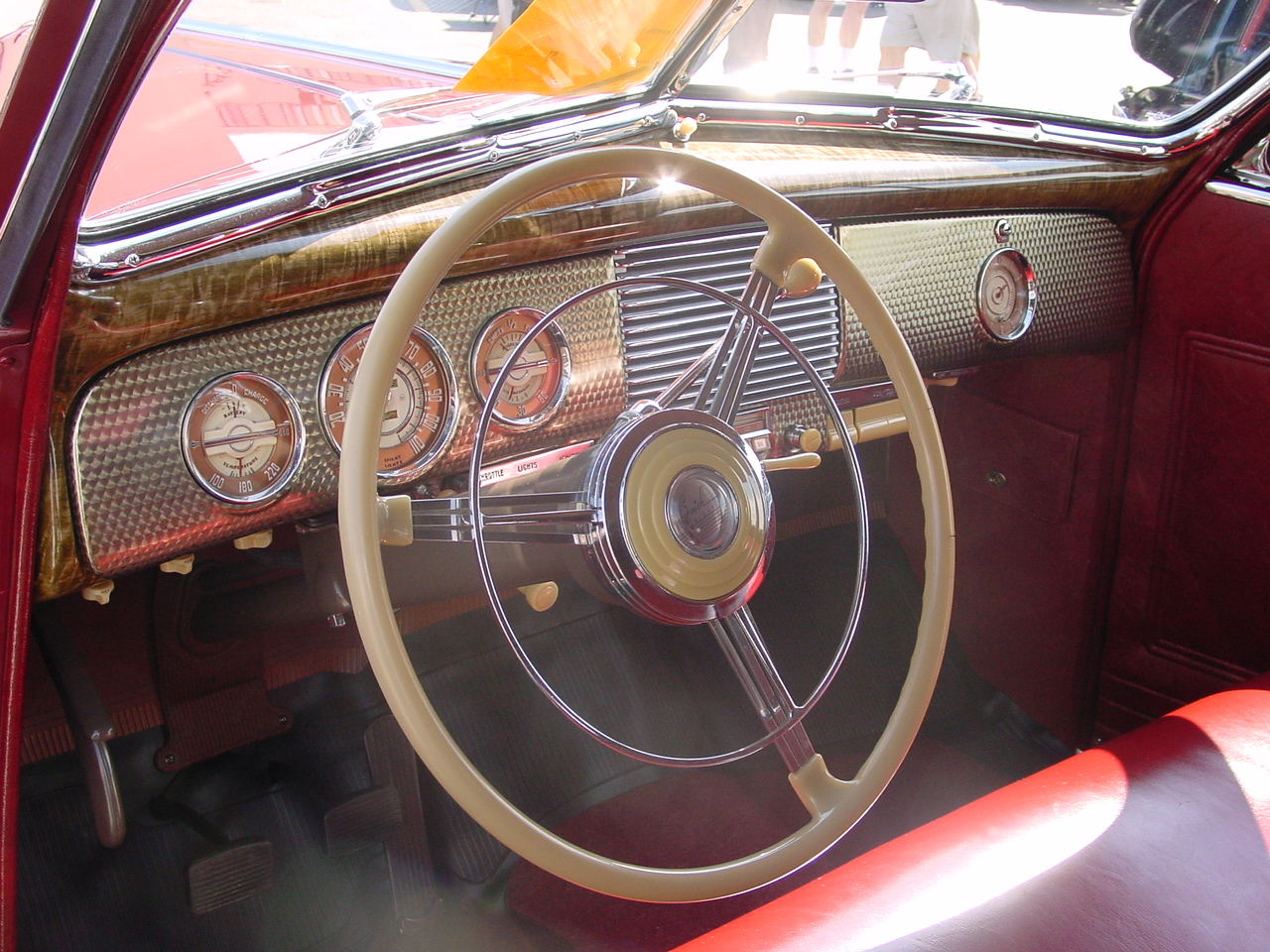
A 1940 Buick Super convertible coupe with a perlée pattern on the dashboard panels, used by Buick in 1940 and 1941.

In the 1920s and 1930s, automobile parts such as valve covers, which are right on top of the engine, were also decorated with perlage engine turning. Similarly, dashboards or the instrument panel of the same were often perlaged. Customizers also would similarly decorate their vehicles with perlage engine-turned panels.

=== Documents ===
Engravings produced by engine turning are often incorporated into the design of bank notes, and other high-value documents, to make counterfeiting difficult. The resulting graphics are called guillochés.

=== Firearms ===
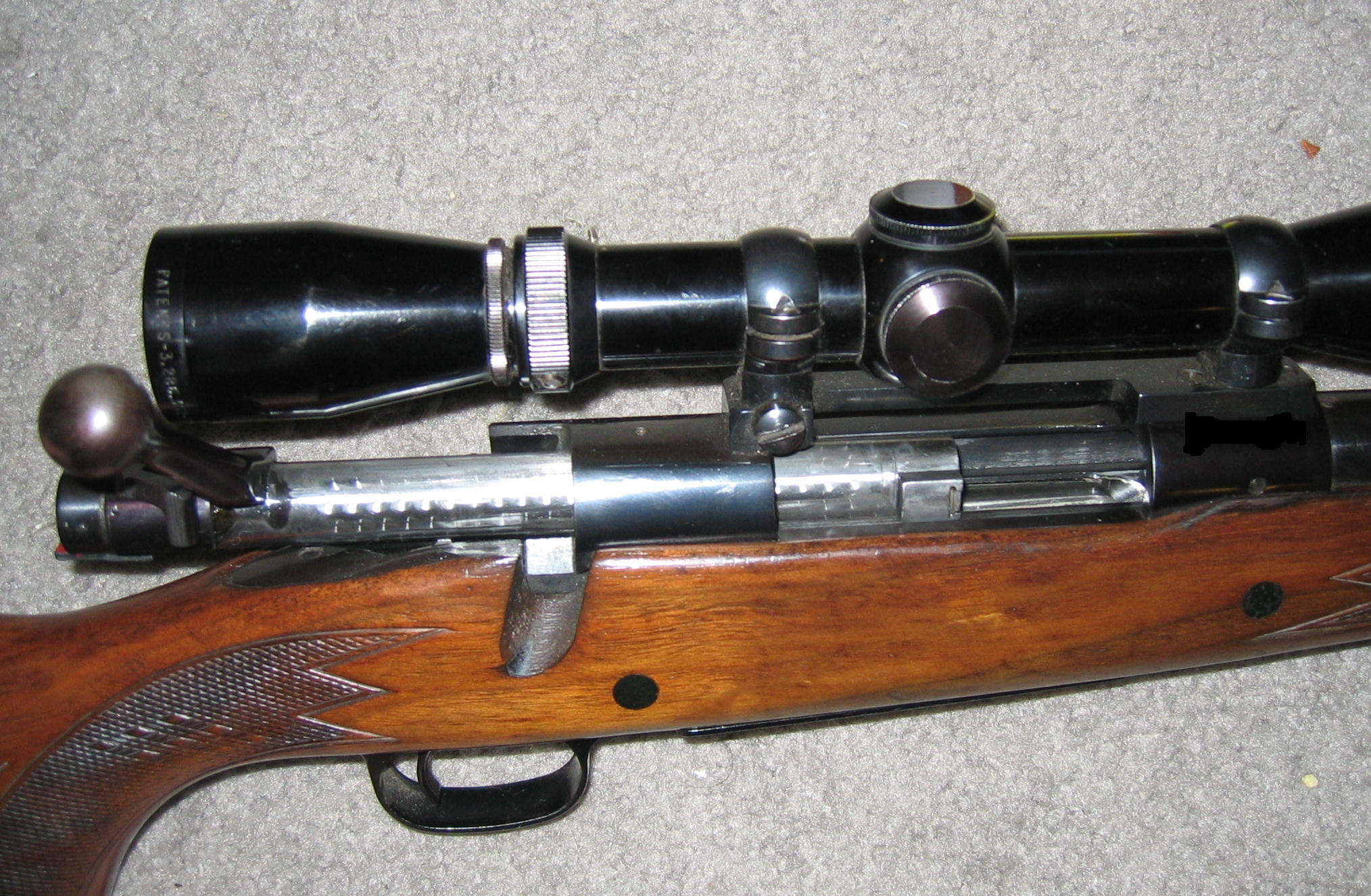
A bolt action rifle with the bolt position open, and jewelling detail on the bolt surface.

Perlage engine turning is also used on various firearm components to prevent corrosion by holding traces of oil and lubricants on the surface, in turn to a polished surface resulting in a smooth operation.

=== Watchmaking ===
Guilloché and perlage are traditional techniques that have been used in watch-making.

== See also ==
- Guilloché
- Perlée
- Rose engine lathe
