= Lathe (disambiguation) =

Lathe may refer to:

== In woodworking and metalworking ==
- Geometric lathe, used for making ornamental patterns on the plates used in printing bank notes and postage stamps
- Lathe (metal), a lathe used specifically for metals
- Lathe, used in turning wood, metals and other materials
- Rose engine lathe, a specialized kind of ornamental lathe

== Other uses ==
- Disc cutting lathe, the groove cutting machine used in the production of vinyl records
- Lathe (county subdivision), formerly an administrative division of the county of Kent, England
- Lathe (graphics), a method of forming 3D computer graphics
- Learning and teaching in higher education (LATHE), and hence the diploma awarded by the University of Oxford, PGDipLATHE
- The LATHE, official student publication of Batangas State University Pablo Borbon.

== See also ==
- Lath, material used to span gaps in structural framing and form a base on which to apply plaster
