= Damaskeening =

A watch movement with damaskeening

Damaskeening is decorative patterning on a watch movement. The term damaskeening is used in America, while in Europe the terms used are Fausses Côtes, Côtes de Genève or Geneva Stripes. Such patterns are made from very fine scratches made by rose engine lathe using small disks, polishing wheels or ivory laps. These patterns look similar to the results of a Spirograph or Guilloché engraving.

The earliest known damaskeened American watch movement is E. Howard & Company movement SN 1,105, a gold-flashed brass movement with a helical hairspring. In the period between 1862 and 1868, the same Boston firm damaskeened approximately 400 Model 1862-N (Series III) gold-flashed movements as well, and about 140 nickel-plated brass movements then were so decorated between 1868 and 1870. Howard used damaskeening in this period to draw the viewer's eye to the Reed's patented main wheel, an important technical feature of the watches. Damaskeening was first used in America on solid nickel movements in 1867 by the U.S. Watch Co of Marion, NJ. In 1868–69, the American Watch Company of Waltham, MA employed damaskeening on small numbers of top grade nickel Model 16KW (a.k.a., Model 1860) and nickel Model 1868 movements. Damaskeening then quickly spread to most other American watch manufacturers and watch grades.

Two-tone damaskeening can be created by applying a thin plating of gold and then having the damaskeening scrape through the gold outer layer and into the nickel plate.

In 2022, the Swiss machine manufacturer SwissKH, which comes from Swiss Know-How, presented its new machine for making this old decor: the Angelo machine.
