= Perlée =

Pearled metallic decorative finish

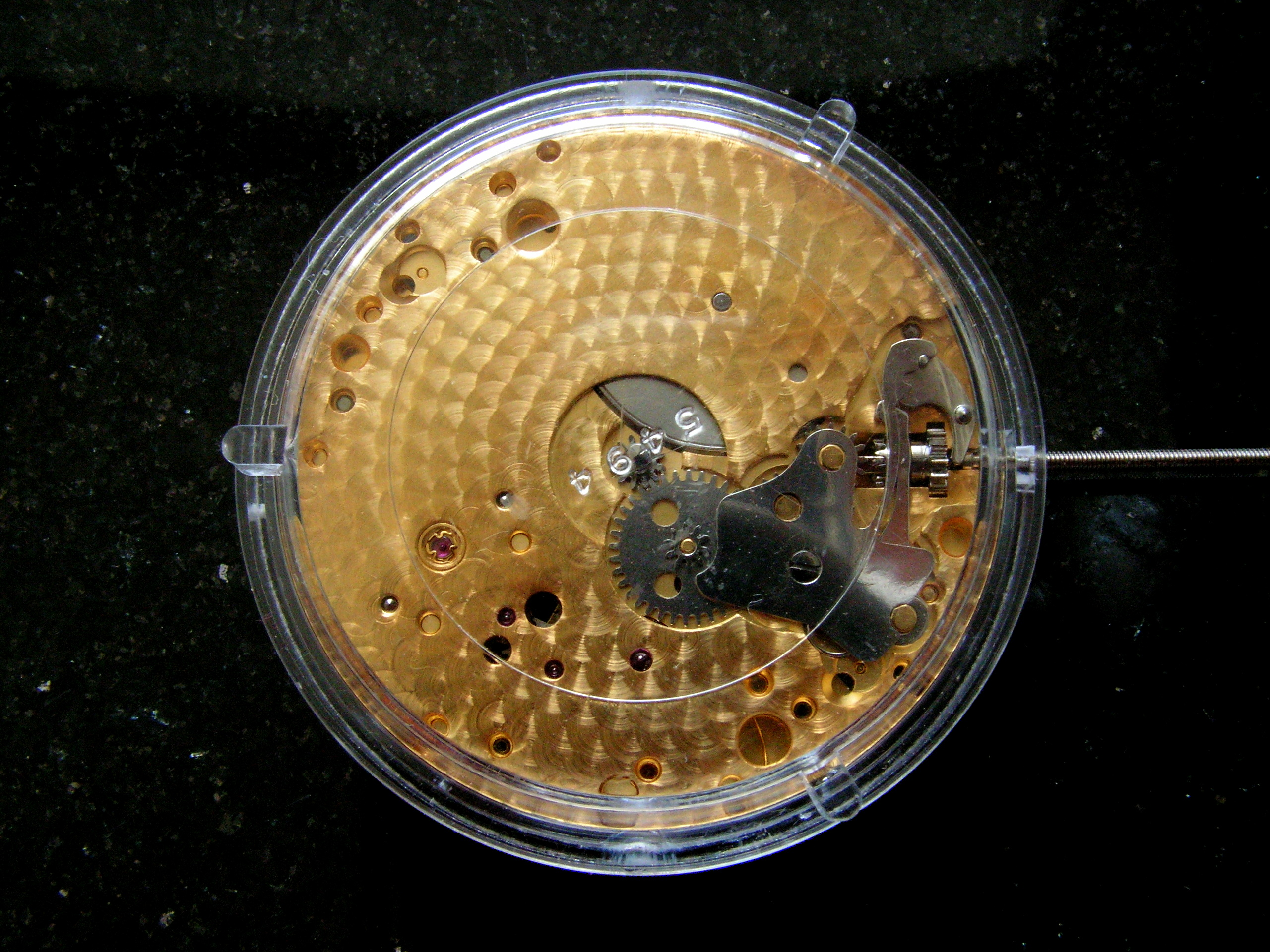
Gold plated watch movement with perlée

Perlée and perlage are French words for pearl pattern, a decorative metallic finish consisting of a pattern of small circles (pearls) applied to a surface by grinding. It is mostly used in the automotive and watchmaking industries as an indicator of expensive craftsmanship, particularly if applied by hand rather than machine.

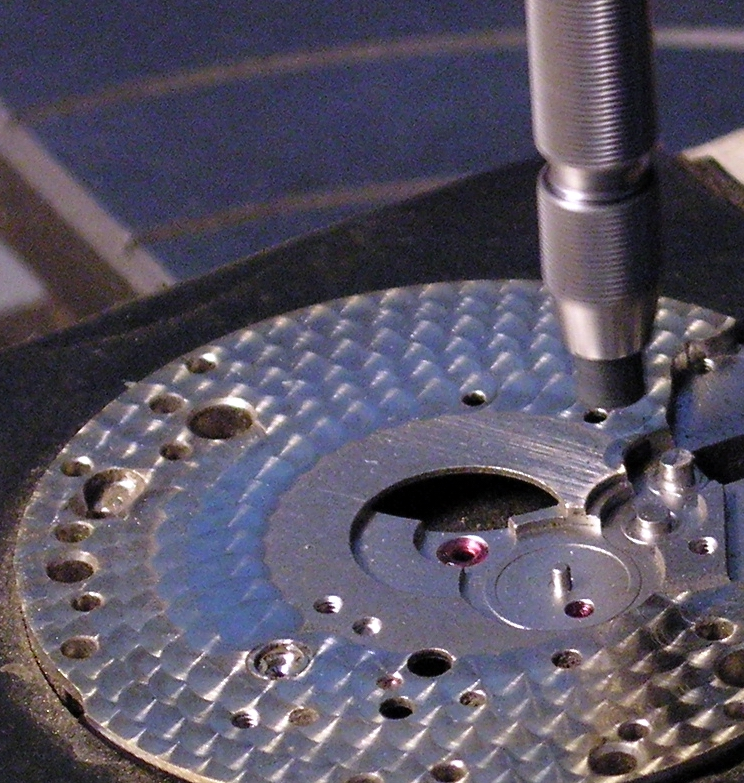
Application of a concentric perlée pattern on a watch movement main plate

== Perlée in the watchmaking industry ==
Watch components that are given a perlée pattern may include the movement main plate and bridges, the inside of the watch case and the watch-case bottom. The perlée patterned parts of a wrist watch are commonly invisible from the outside except if the watch has a transparent casing or deliberately exposed internal parts.

Further grinding patterns used by watchmakers include the clavus pattern, also known by the French term oeil-de-perdrix (partridge eye).

== Perlée in the automotive and aviation industries ==
The automotive industry has used perlée patterns on surfaces such as car dashboards since its infancy, but these days it is generally confined to luxury vehicles such as the Bugatti Veyron 16.4. Many aircraft of the Golden Age of Aviation had perlée engine-turning finishing used on their sheetmetal components, with one of the best-known examples being Charles Lindbergh's Spirit of St. Louis trans-Atlantic Ryan NYP aircraft of 1927.

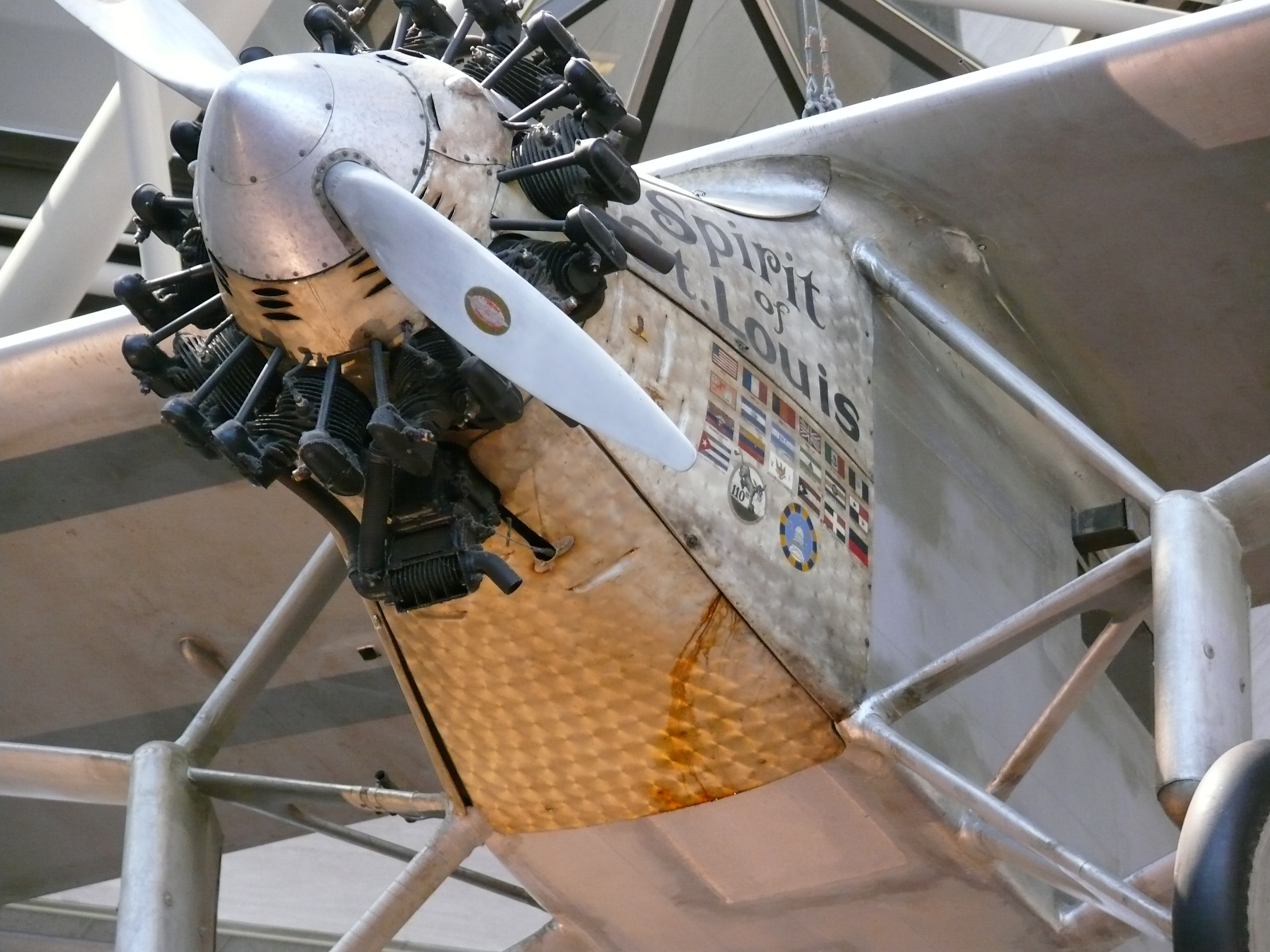
Lindberg's Spirit of St. Louis with its perlée-finish sheetmetal nose panels.

== See also ==
- Engine turning
- Guilloché
