= Guilloché =

Decorative technique

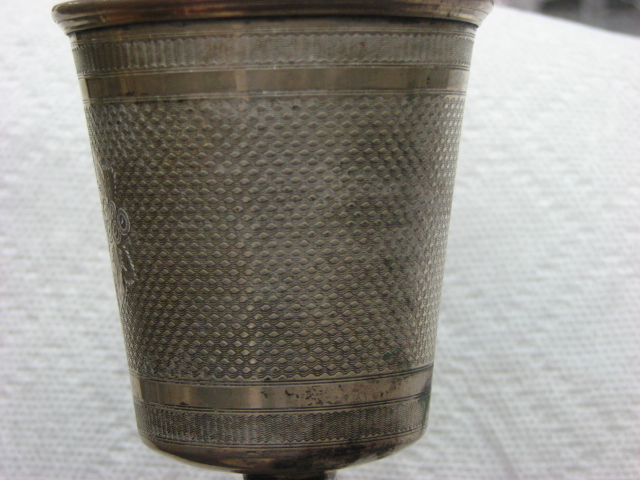
Guilloche work without enamel

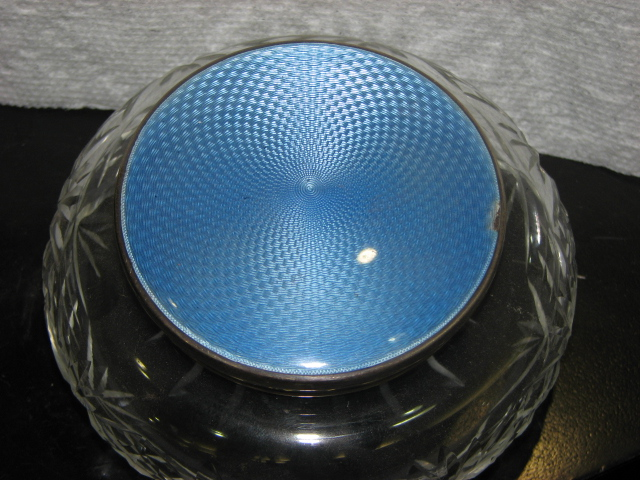
Guilloche work with enamel

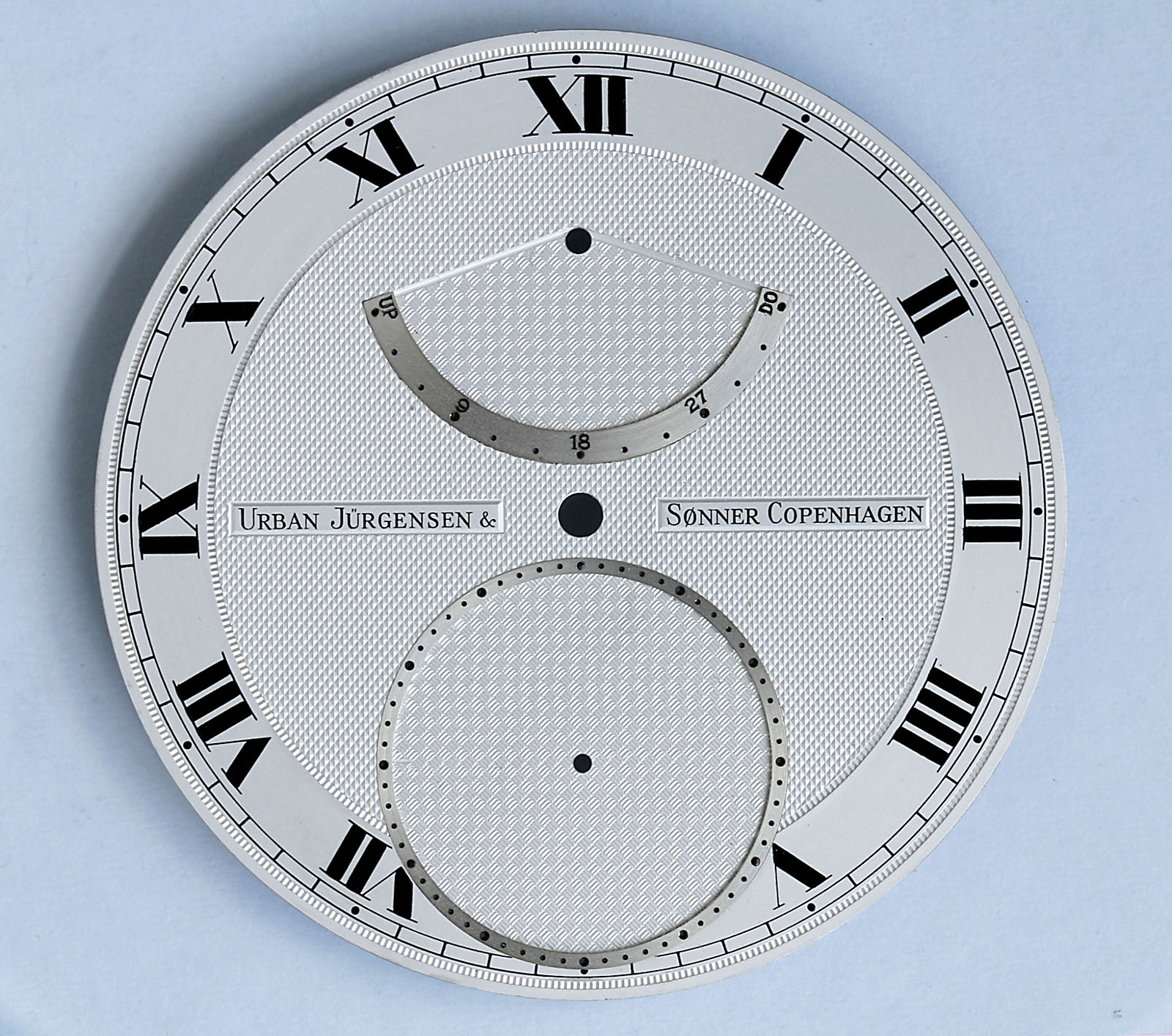
An engine-turned (guilloché) watch dial made by Derek Pratt and rejected by him due to imperfections that are almost invisible to the bare eye.

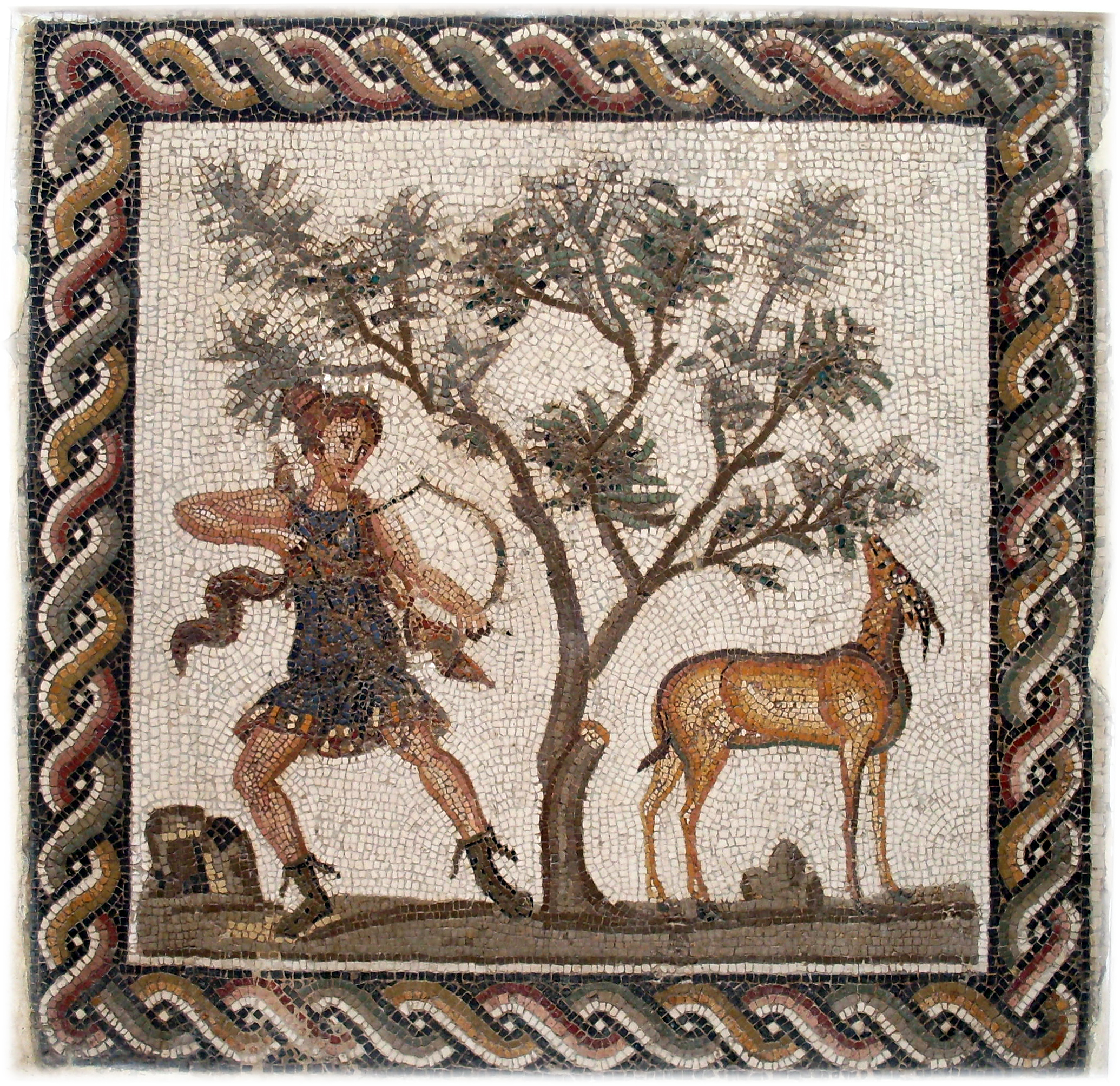
Roman guilloche around a scene with Diana the Huntress, late 2nd century AD, mosaic, Bardo National Museum, Tunis, Tunisia

Guilloché (French: [ɡijɔʃe]), or guilloche (/ɡɪˈloʊʃ/), is a decorative technique in which a very precise, intricate, and repetitive pattern is mechanically engraved into an underlying material via engine turning, which uses a machine of the same name. Engine turning machines may include the rose engine lathe and also the straight-line engine. This mechanical technique improved on more time-consuming designs achieved by hand and allowed for greater delicacy, precision, and closeness of line, as well as greater speed.

The term guilloche became also used more generally for repetitive architectural patterns of intersecting or overlapping spirals or other shapes, as used in the Ancient Near East, classical Greece and Rome and neo-classical architecture, and Early Medieval interlace decoration in Anglo-Saxon art and elsewhere. Medieval Cosmatesque stone inlay designs with two ribbons winding around a series of regular central points are very often called guilloche. These central points are often blank, but may contain a figure, such as a rose. These senses are a back-formation from the engraving guilloché, so called because the architectural motifs resemble the designs produced by later guilloché techniques.

== Uncertain etymology ==
The name guilloché is French, dating back at least to the 1770s, and is often said to be called after a French engineer named Guillot, who invented a tool or turning machine. However no dates nor first name are provided for this shadowy figure, and many dictionaries seem suspicious of his existence.

== History ==
Engine turning machines were first used in the 1500–1600s on soft materials such as ivory and wood. In the 18th century they were adopted for metals such as gold and silver. Some accounts give the credit of developing tightly-packed engraved guilloché decoration to the Nuremberg glass-making dynasty of the Schwanhardt family in the 17th century, using a wheel to engrave the glass.

Engine turning machines made of cast iron and heavy wooden bases, with precision machined surfaces were made until circa 1967 (e.g. Neuweiler und Engelsberger). Individuals continue the craft of making these elegant machines, but in limited quantities.

A Guilloche Machine was granted a US Patent in 1968 by Wilhelm Brandstatter. The original assignor was a firm called Maschinenfabrik Michael Kampf KG. A photo of this machine can be seen at Turati Lombardi's history page.

In the 1920s and '30s, automobile parts such as valve covers, which are atop the engine, were also engine-turned. Similarly, dashboards or the instrument panel of the same were often engine-turned. Customizers also would decorate their vehicles with engine-turning panels similarly.

The English word Guilloche (without an accented é) describes a narrow instance of guilloché: a design, frequently architectural, using two curved bands that interlace in a pattern around a central space. Some dictionaries give only this definition of guilloche, although others include the broader meaning associated with guilloché as a second meaning. Note that in the original sense, even a straight line can be guilloché, and persons using the French spelling and pronunciation generally intend the broader, original meaning. Translucent enamel was applied over guilloché metal by Peter Carl Fabergé on the Fabergé eggs and other pieces from the 1880s.

== In today’s terminology ==
In consequence of the nature of the design, which is usually a series of lines that are, or look very much like they are interwoven into one another, any design engraved on metal, printed, or otherwise erected on surfaces such as wood or stone, that go in a similar style of constant wriggling that interlock – or look like they are interlocking – with one another, is referred to as guilloché.

Some of the more common ones are the following:

- Engraved (in metal, mainly sterling): in fine timepieces (mainly pocket watches), fine pens, jewelry charms, snuffboxes, hair-styling accessories, wine goblets etc. Examples of famous works of Guilloché are the engravings on Fabergé eggs.
- Erected: on stone for architecture, in wood for styling, on furniture or molding, etc.
- Printed: on bank notes, currency, passports, certificates, etc., to protect against forged copies. The pattern used in this instance is called a spirograph in mathematics, that is, a hypotrochoid generated by a fixed point on a circle rolling inside a fixed circle. It has parametric equations. These patterns bear a strong resemblance to the designs produced on the Spirograph, a children's toy.

== Other names for guilloché ==
The engine turning machine characteristic of guilloché is called by other names in specific uses:

- Rose engine (metalwork)
- Straight line engine turning Tour à guilloché (metalwork)
- Holtzapffel lathe, named after the founder of an ornamental lathe manufacturer John Jacob Holtzapffel
- Decoration lathe (metalwork)
- Damaskeening (watch movements and horology)
- Geometric lathe (security printing)
- Cycloidal engine (security printing)
- Ornamental turning or ornamental lathe (woodcarving).

The different types of the machines refer to different models and different times during the development of the engine-turning machine.

== Gallery ==
=== Engraving technique ===
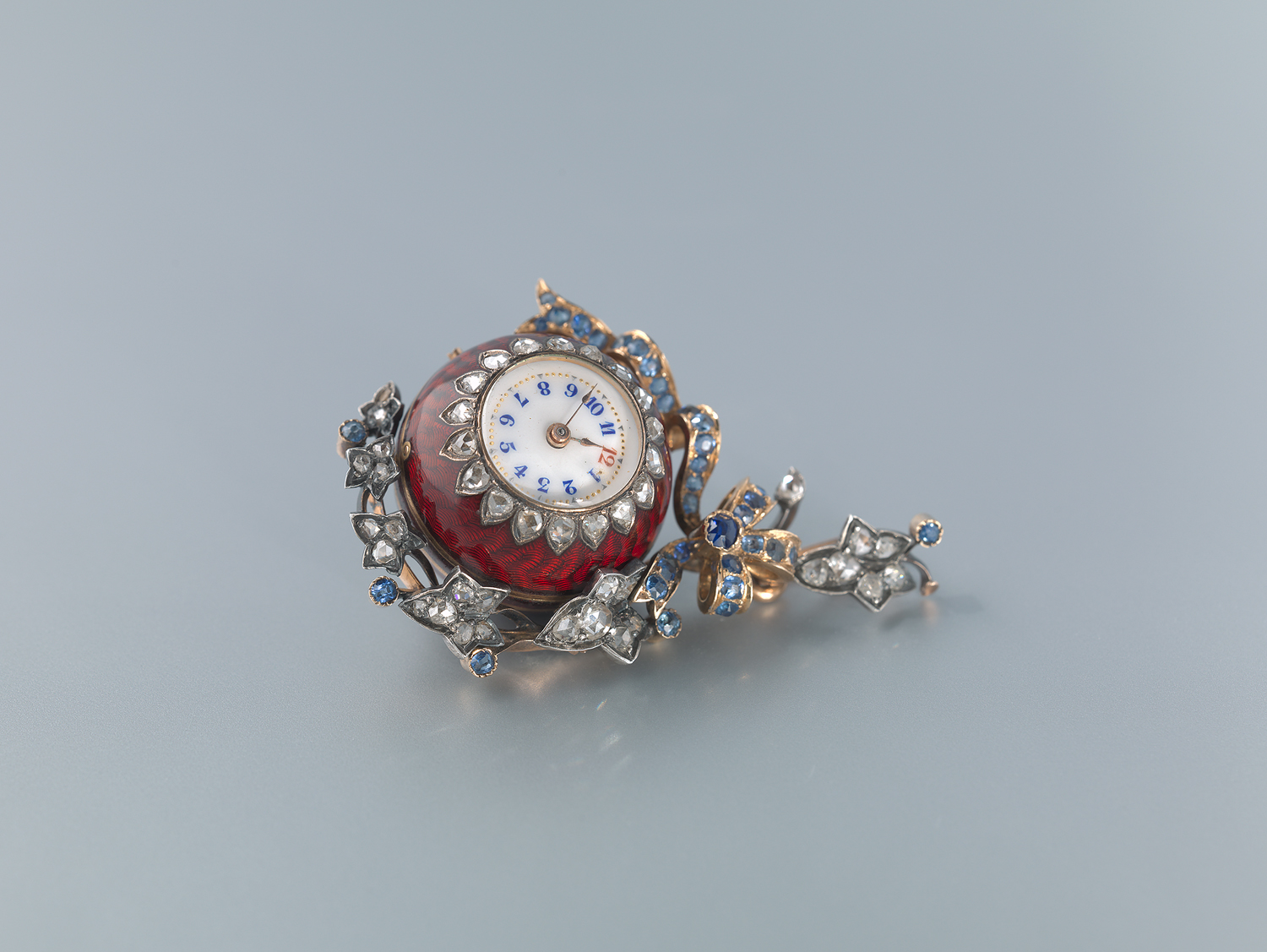
A red guilloché enamel Boule de Genève

Guilloche work with enamel

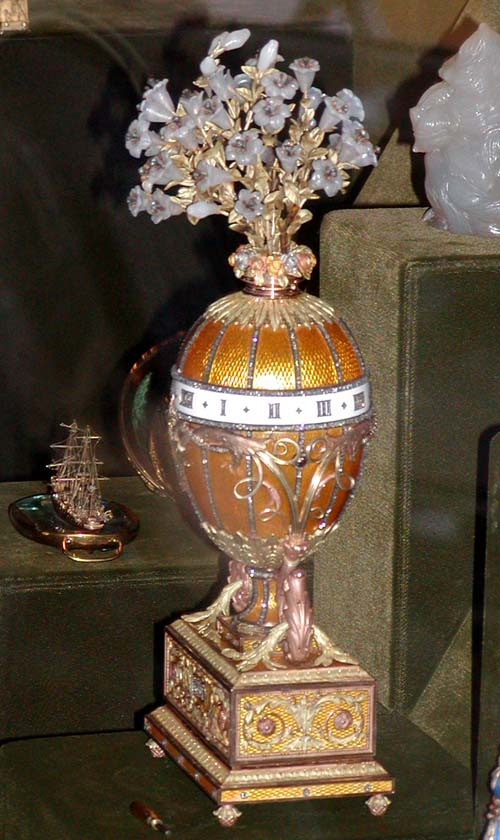
Bouquet of Lilies Fabergé Egg

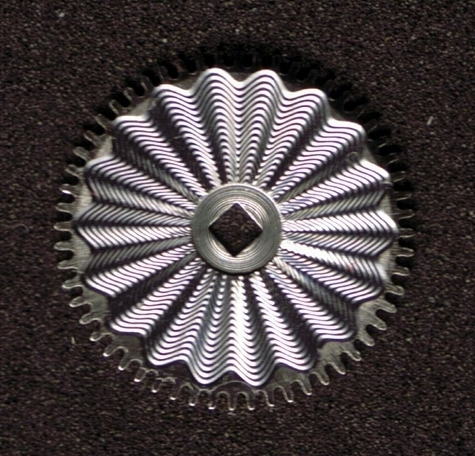
Solar guilloche pattern on a watch movement crown wheel

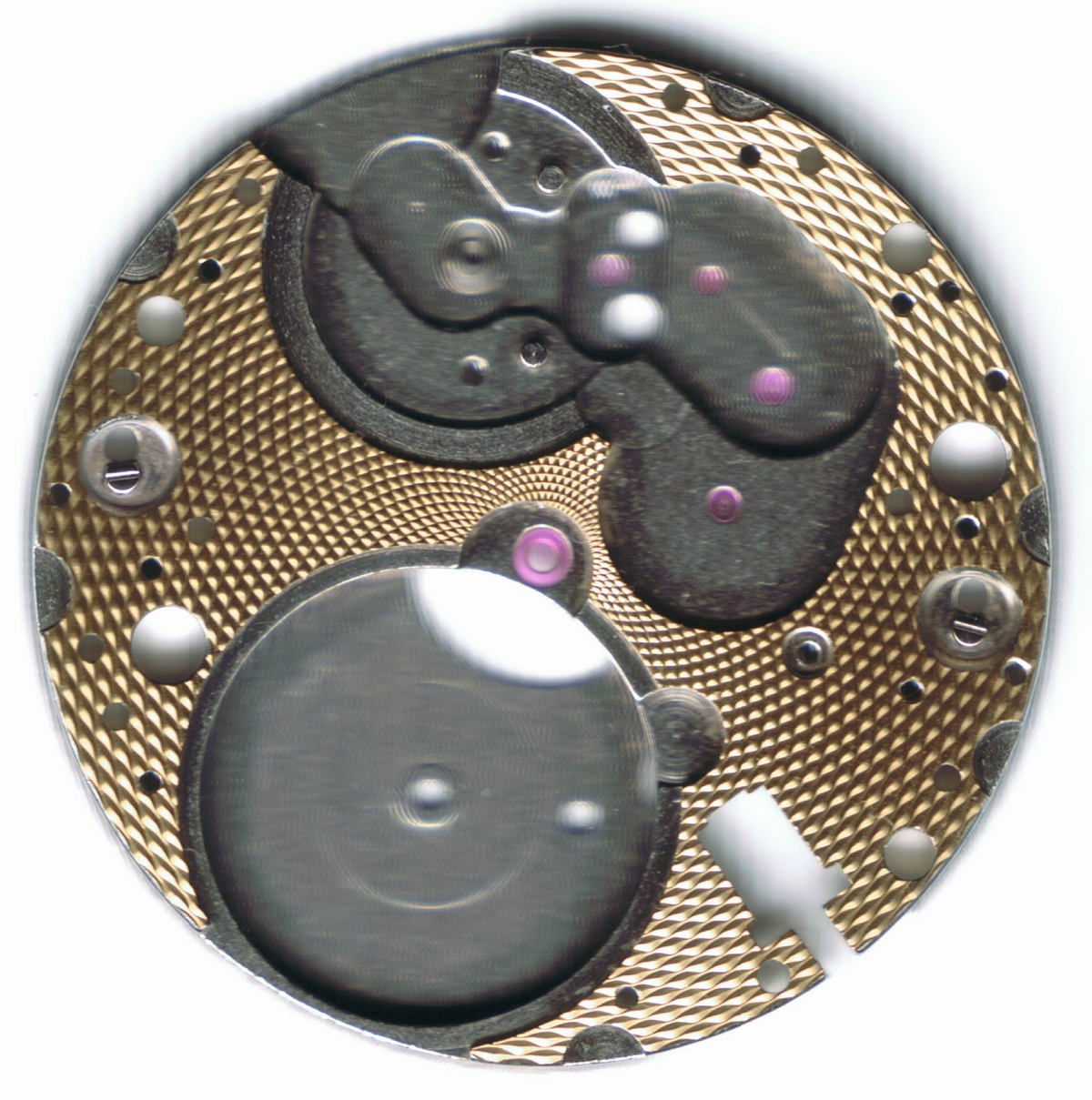
Barley guilloche pattern on a watch movement main plate

=== Ornament ===
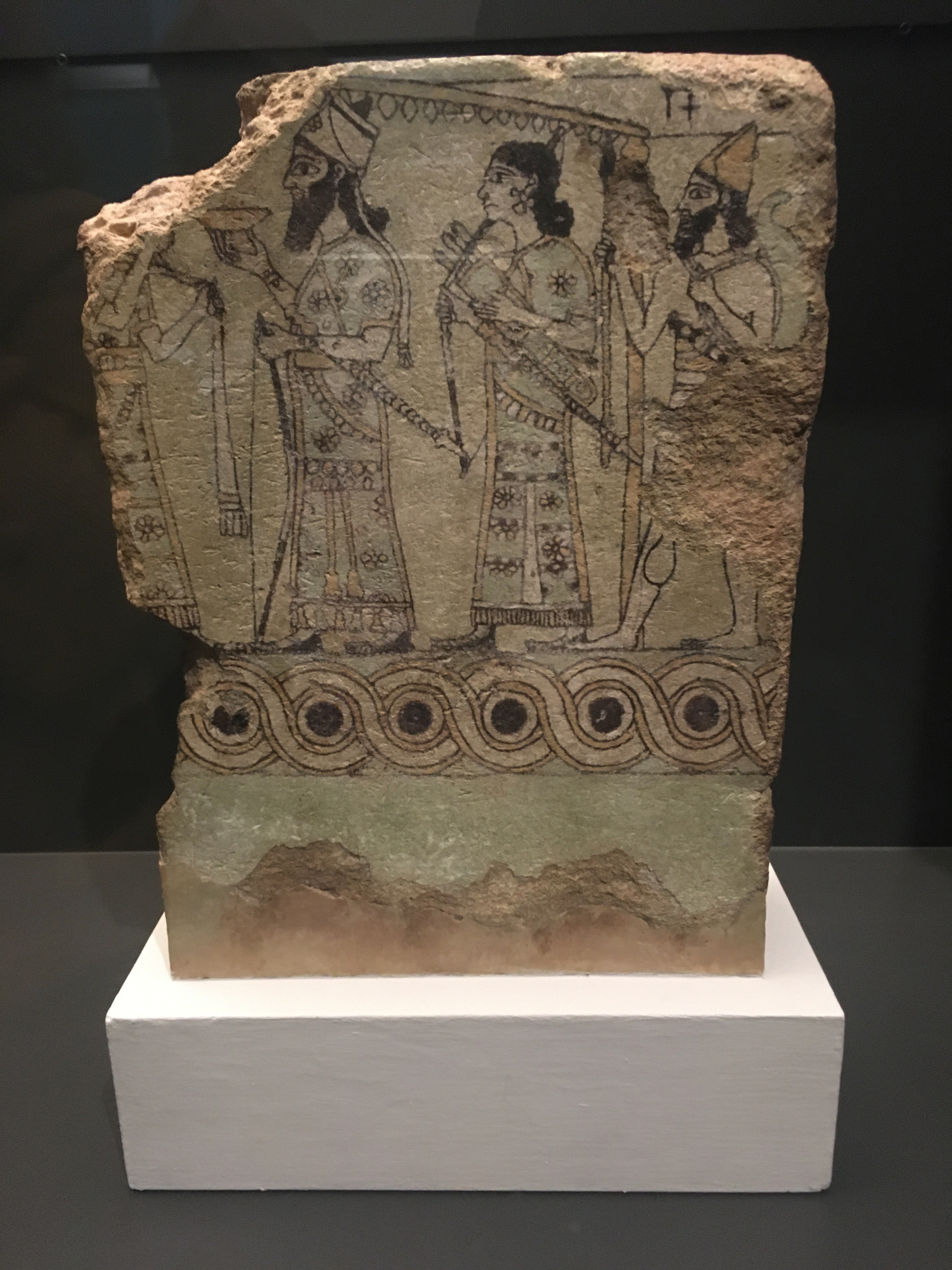
Assyrian tile with a guilloché border from the North-West Palace at Nimrud (now in modern Iraq), 883-859 BC, glazed earthenware, British Museum, London

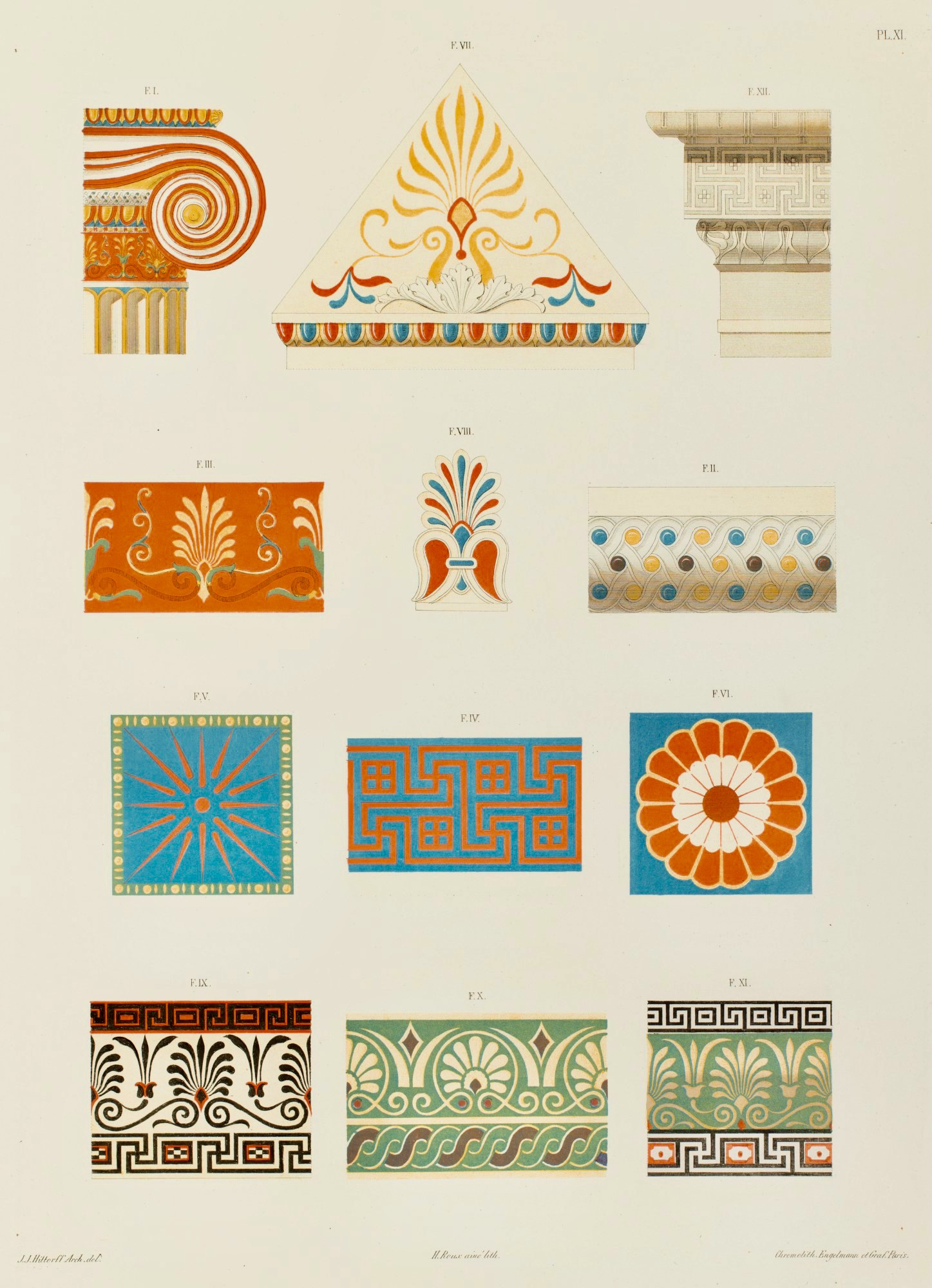
19th century illustration of multiple polychrome elements of Ancient Greek architecture, including a guillochés on the right, by Jacques Ignace Hittorff

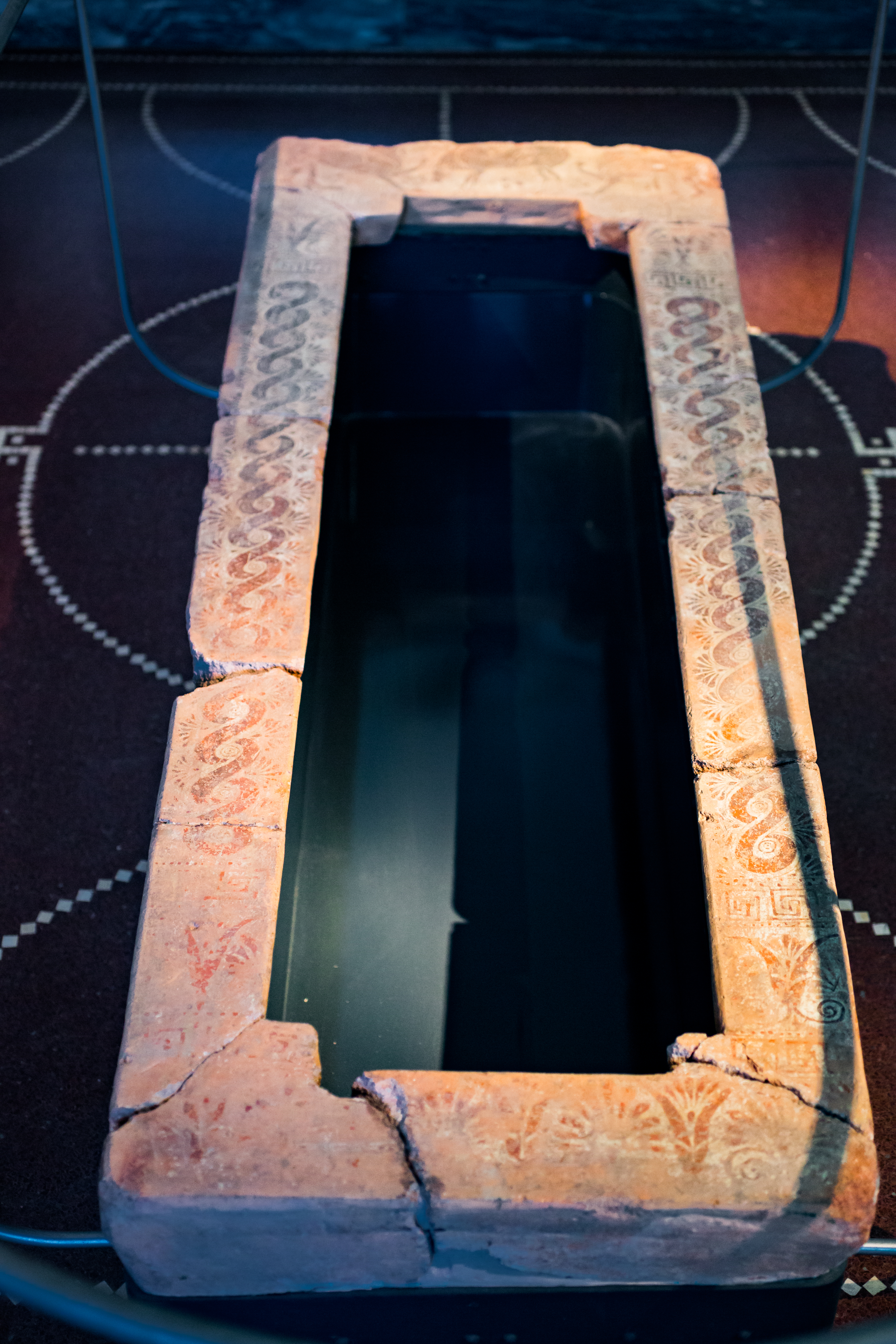
Ancient Greek guilloché on the Klazomenian sarcophagus, c.500–470 BC, painted clay, Ny Carlsberg Glyptotek, Copenhagen, Denmark

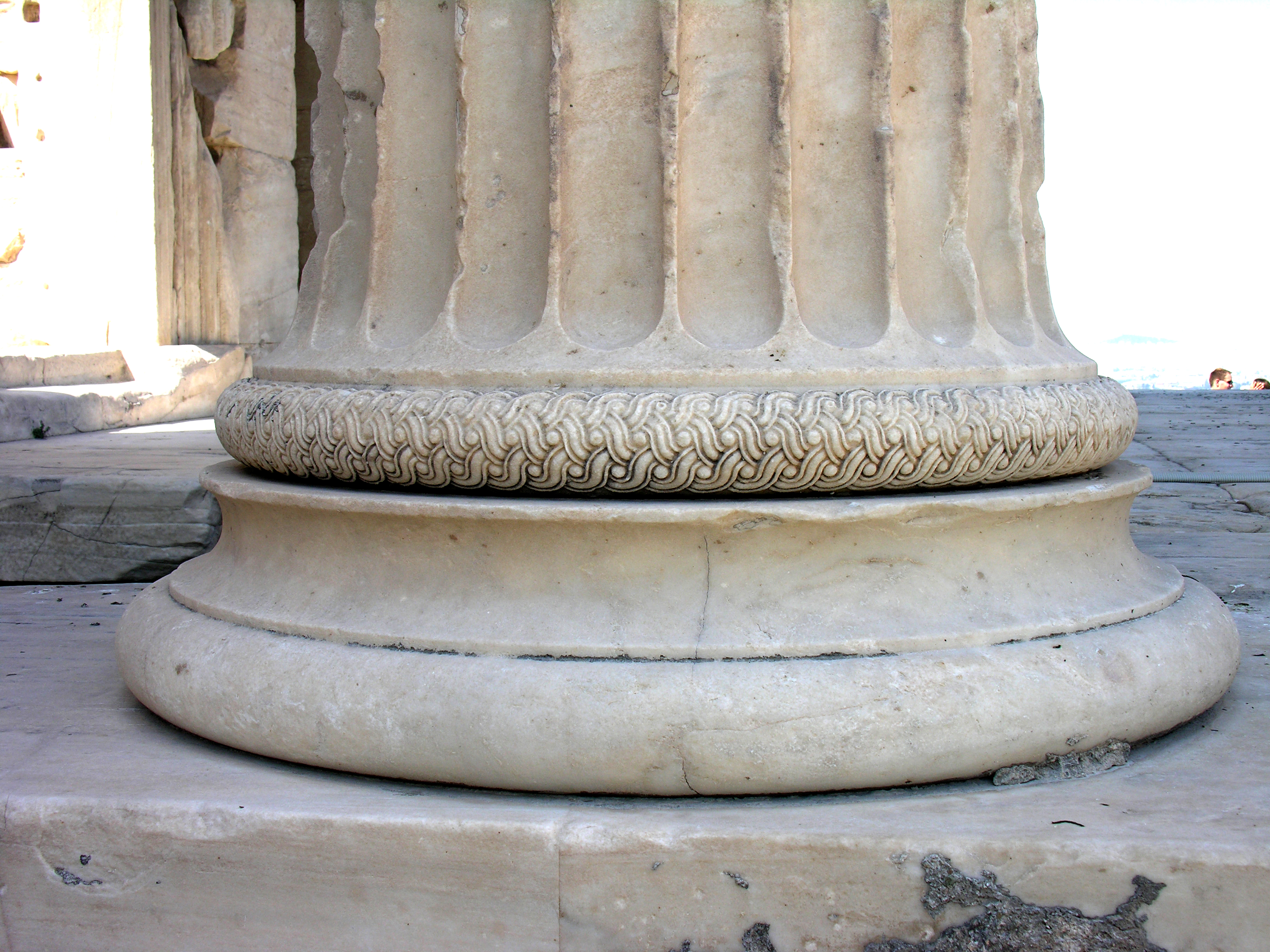
Ancient Greek guilloché on an Ionic column of the Erechtheion, Athens, Greece, unknown architect, 421–405 BC

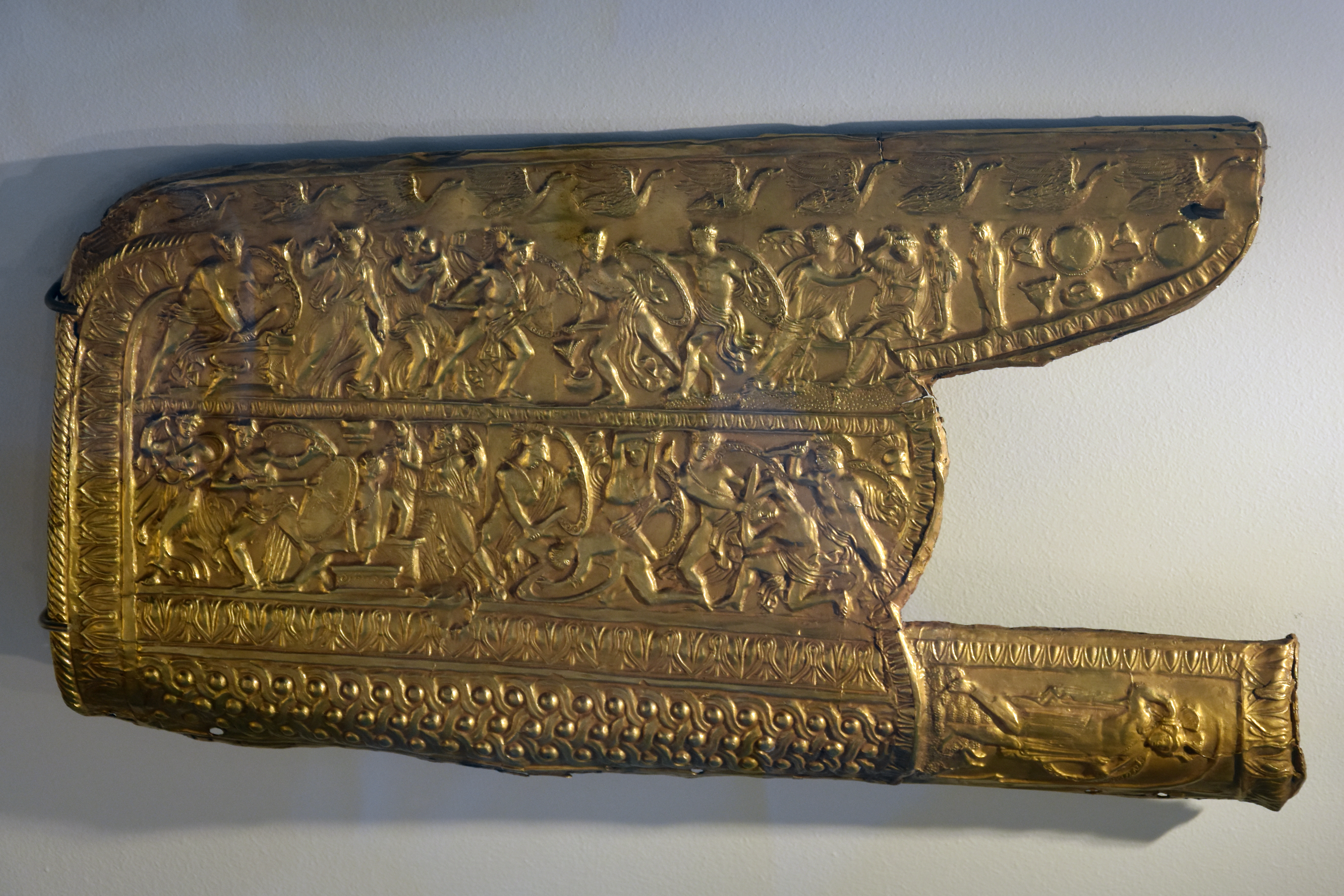
Ancient Greek guilloché on a gorytos, 400-336 BC, silver and gold, Museum of the Royal Tombs of Aigai, Vergina, Greece

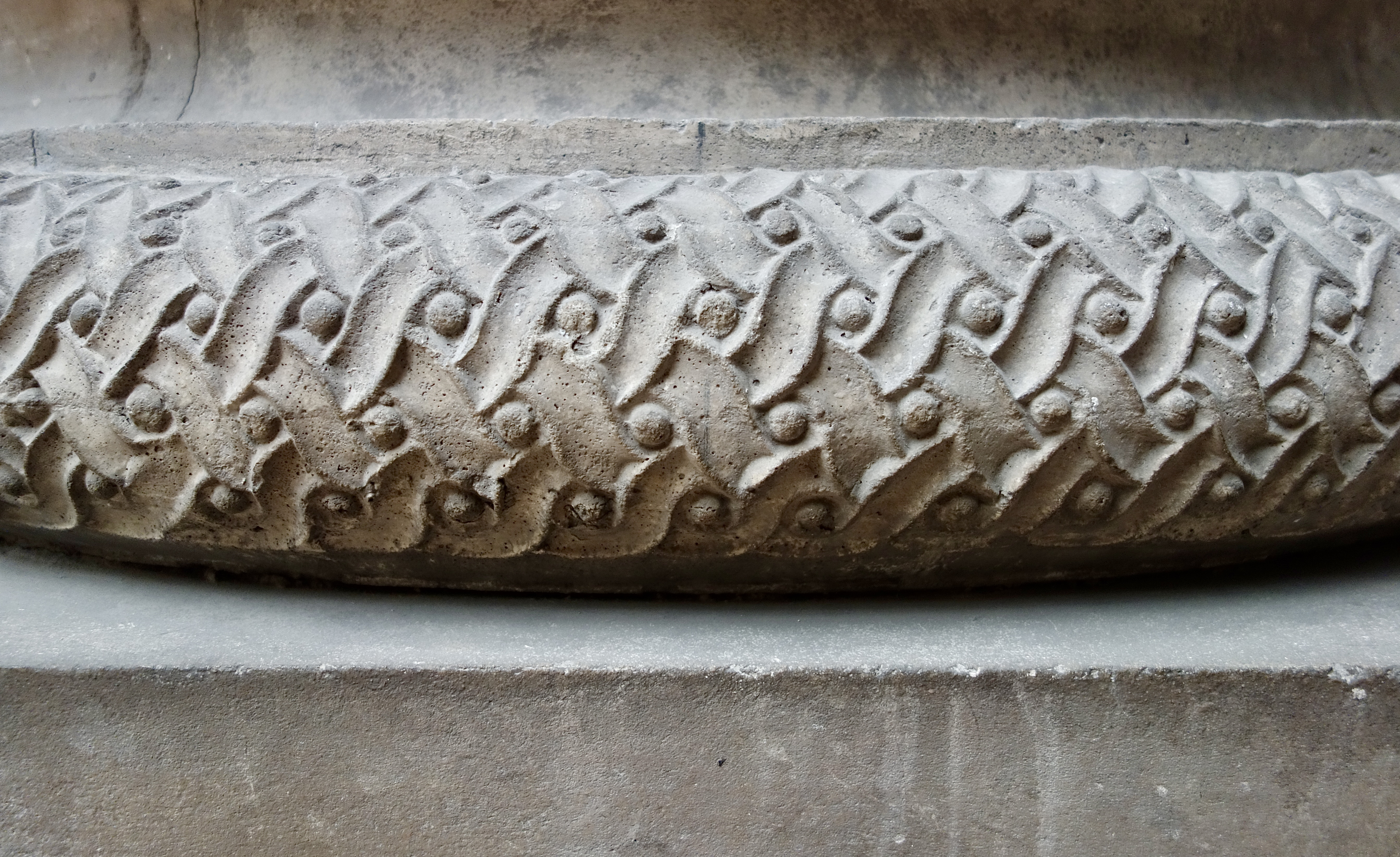
Roman guilloché on the base of a column of the Trajaneum from Pergamon, now in the Pergamon Museum, Berlin, Germany, unknown architect, 115–30 AD

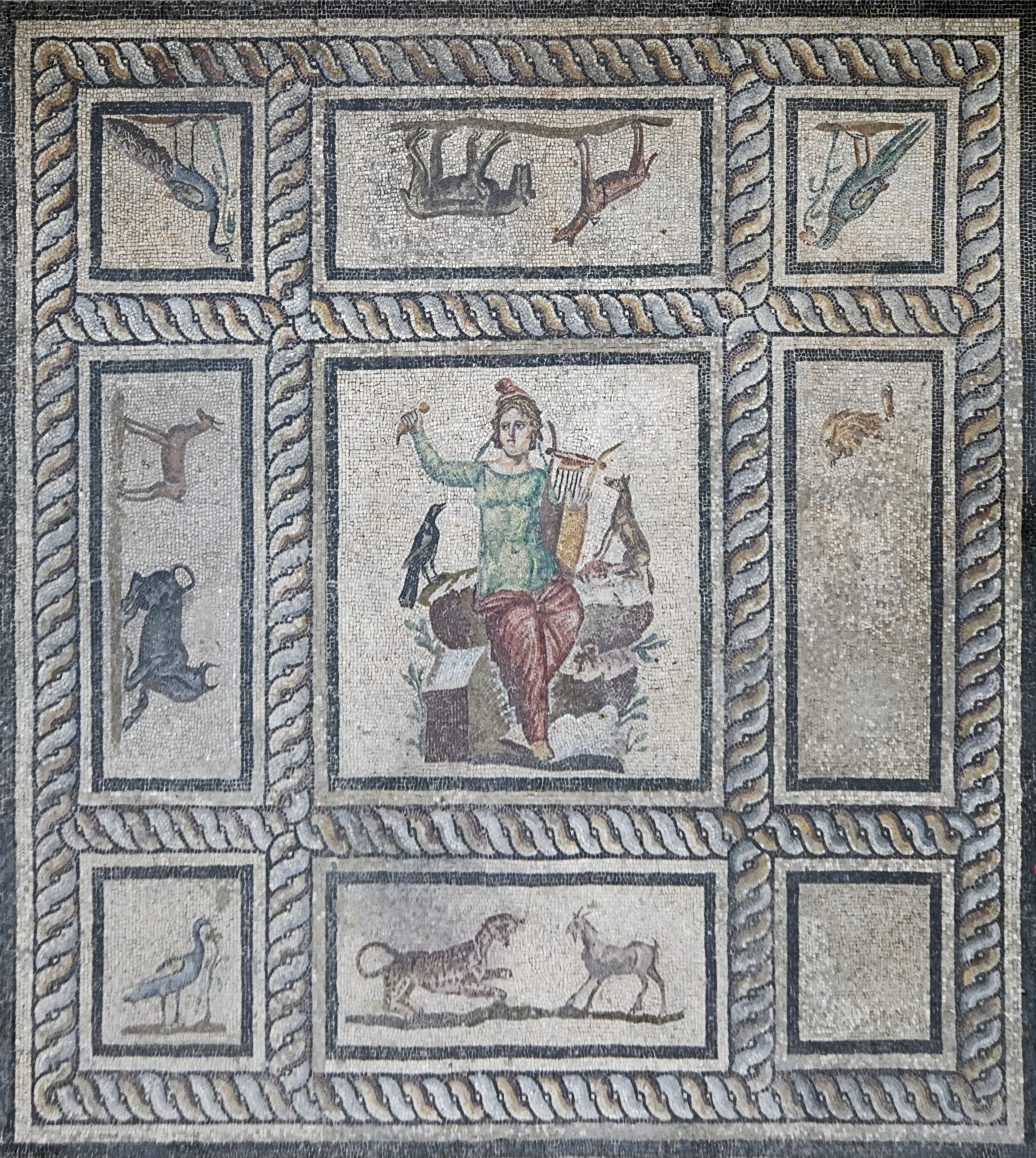
Roman guilloché on the Orpheus mosaic from the dining room of a Roman house, c.200, natural stone and glass, Pergamon Museum

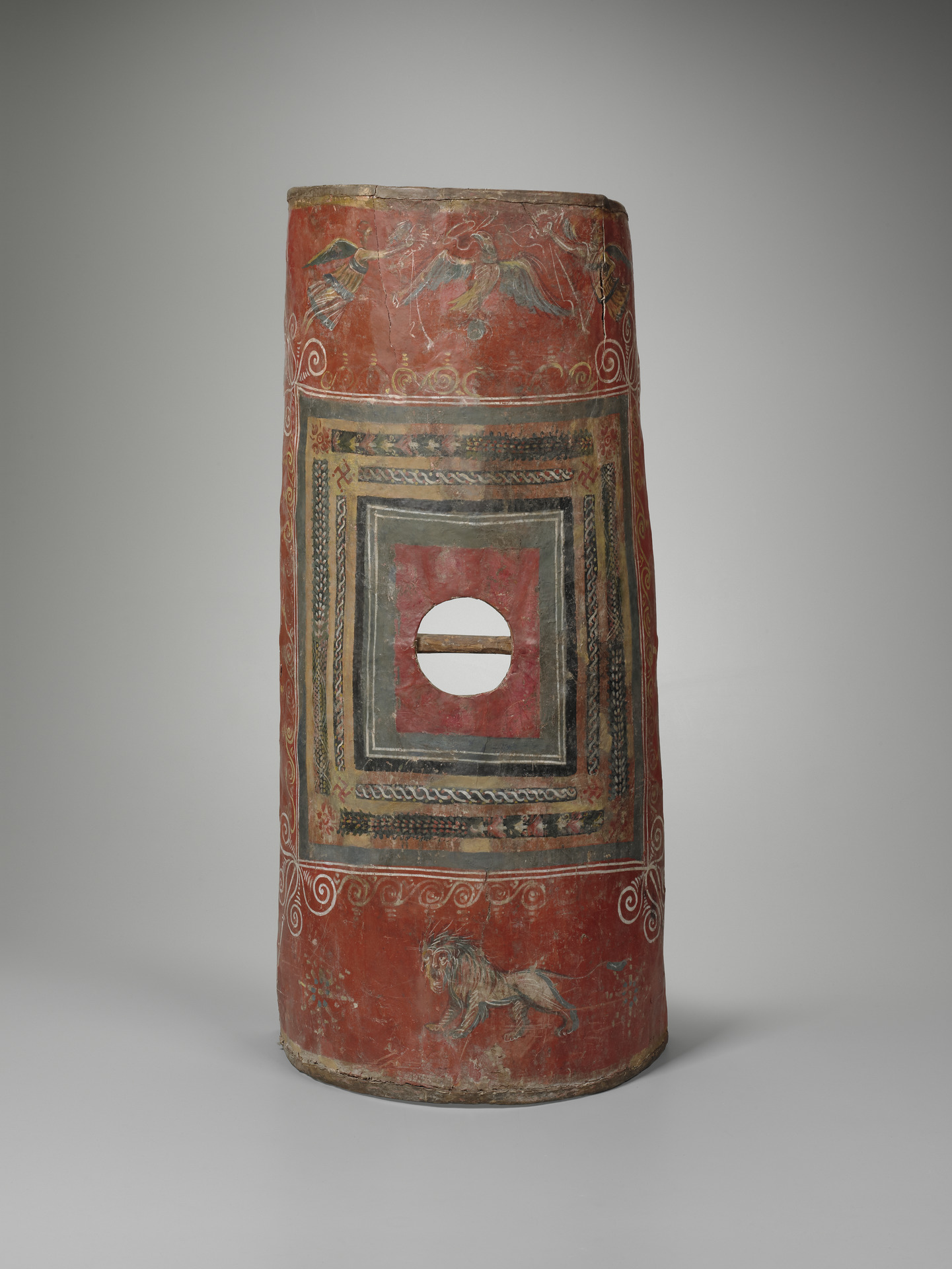
Roman guilloché on a shield, mid 3rd century, painted wood and hide, Yale University Art Gallery, New Haven, Connecticut, US

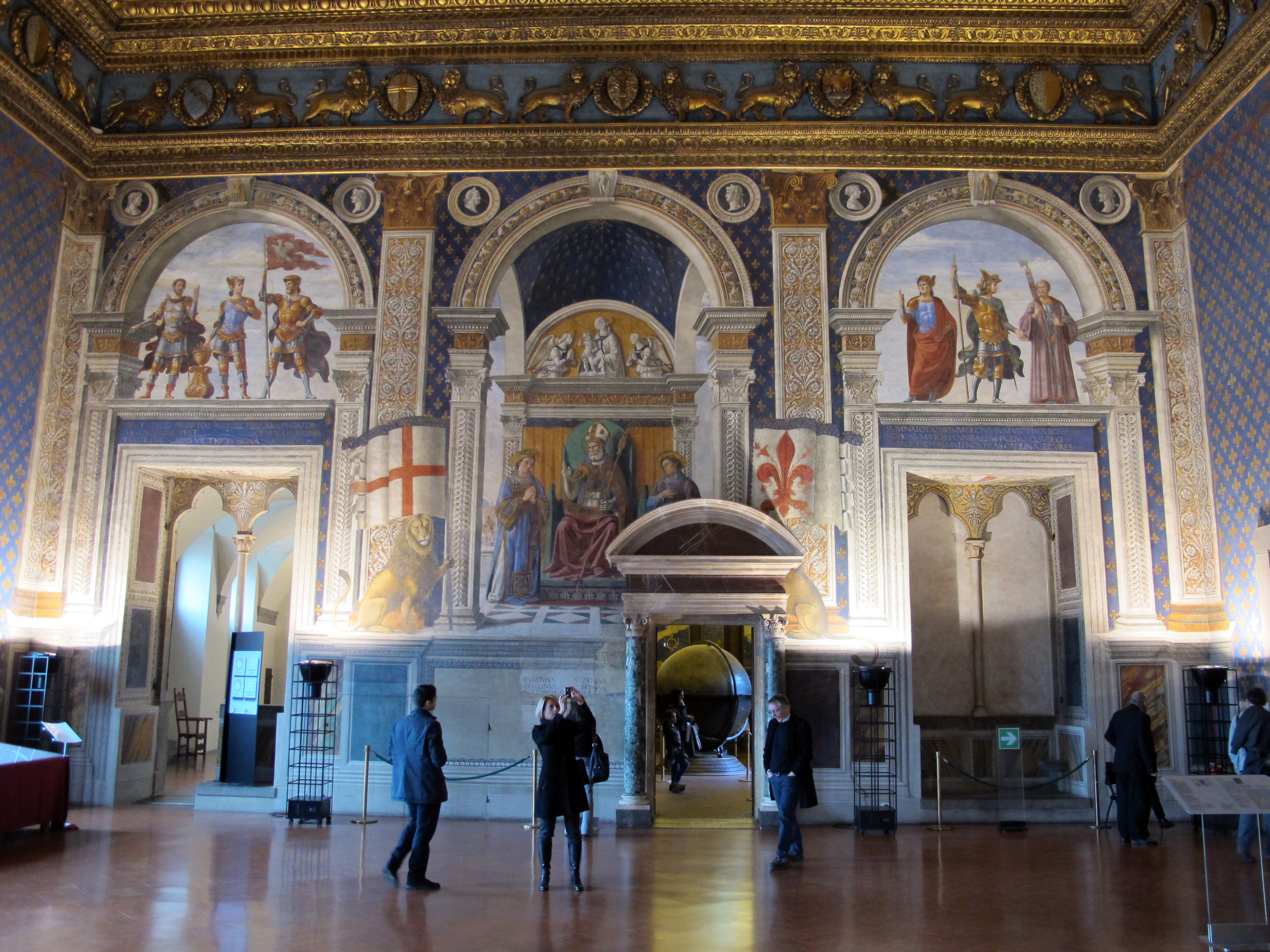
Renaissance guillochés on some pilasters, part of the Sala dei Gigli frescos, Palazzo Vecchio, Florence, Italy, by Domenico Ghirlandaio, 1482-1484

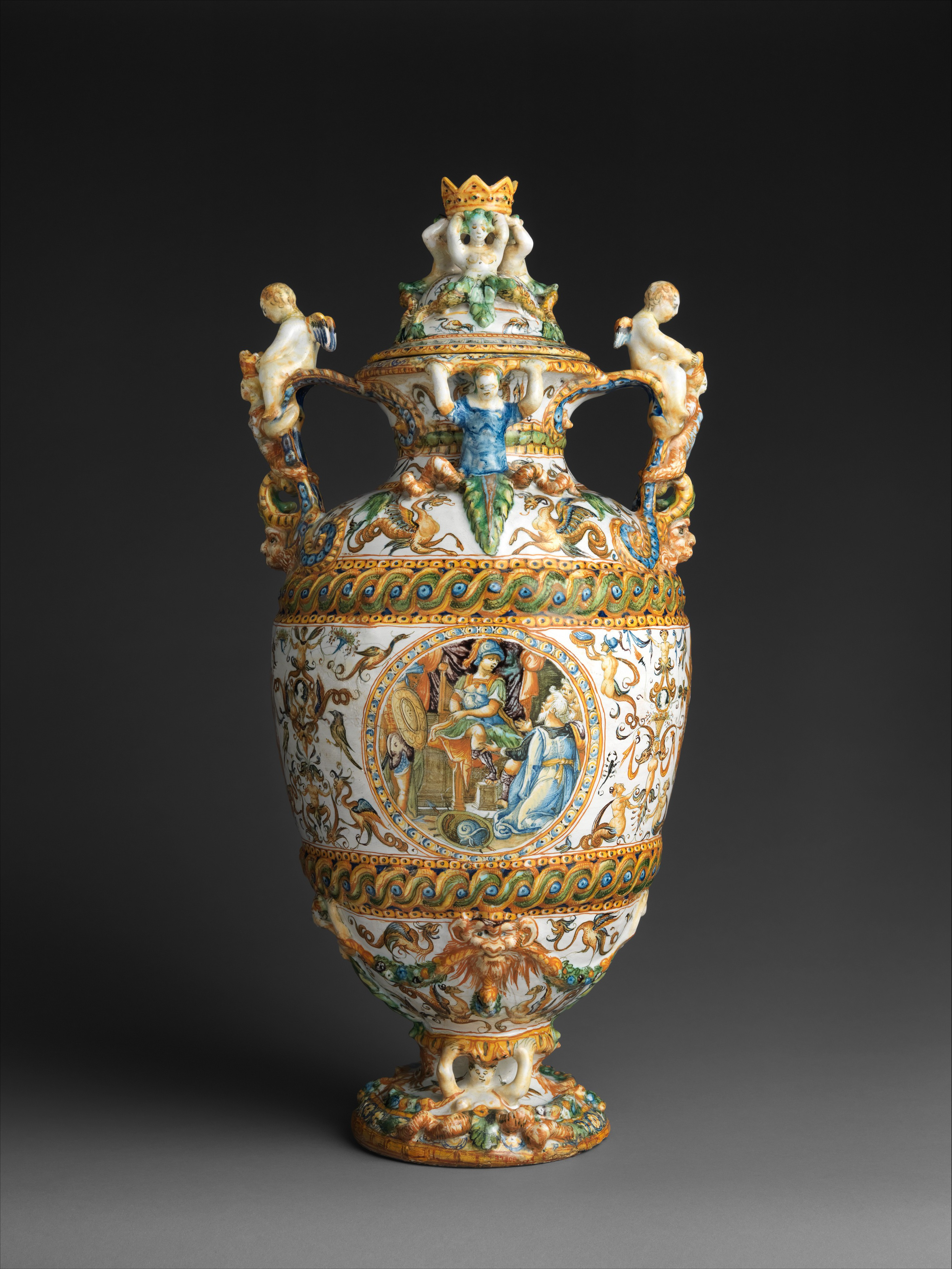
Renaissance guillochés on a pharmacy jar called The Campaigns of Julius Caesar, 1580–1581, maiolica (tin-glazed earthenware), Metropolitan Museum of Art, New York City

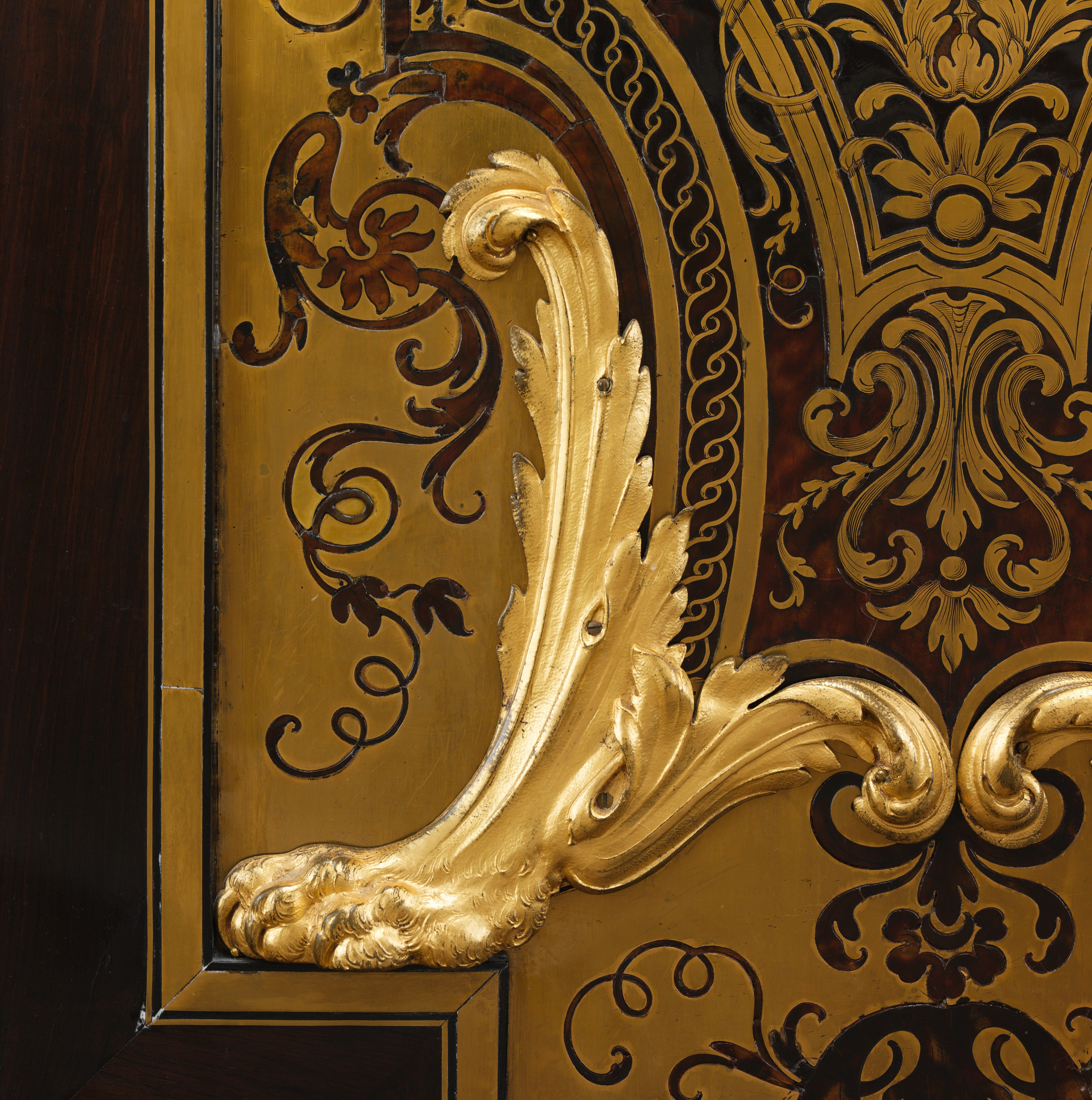
Baroque guilloché on a cabinet, André Charles Boulle, c.1700, oak veneered with Macassar and Gabon ebony, ebonized fruitwood, burl wood, and marquetry of tortoiseshell and brass, gilt bronze, Metropolitan Museum of Art

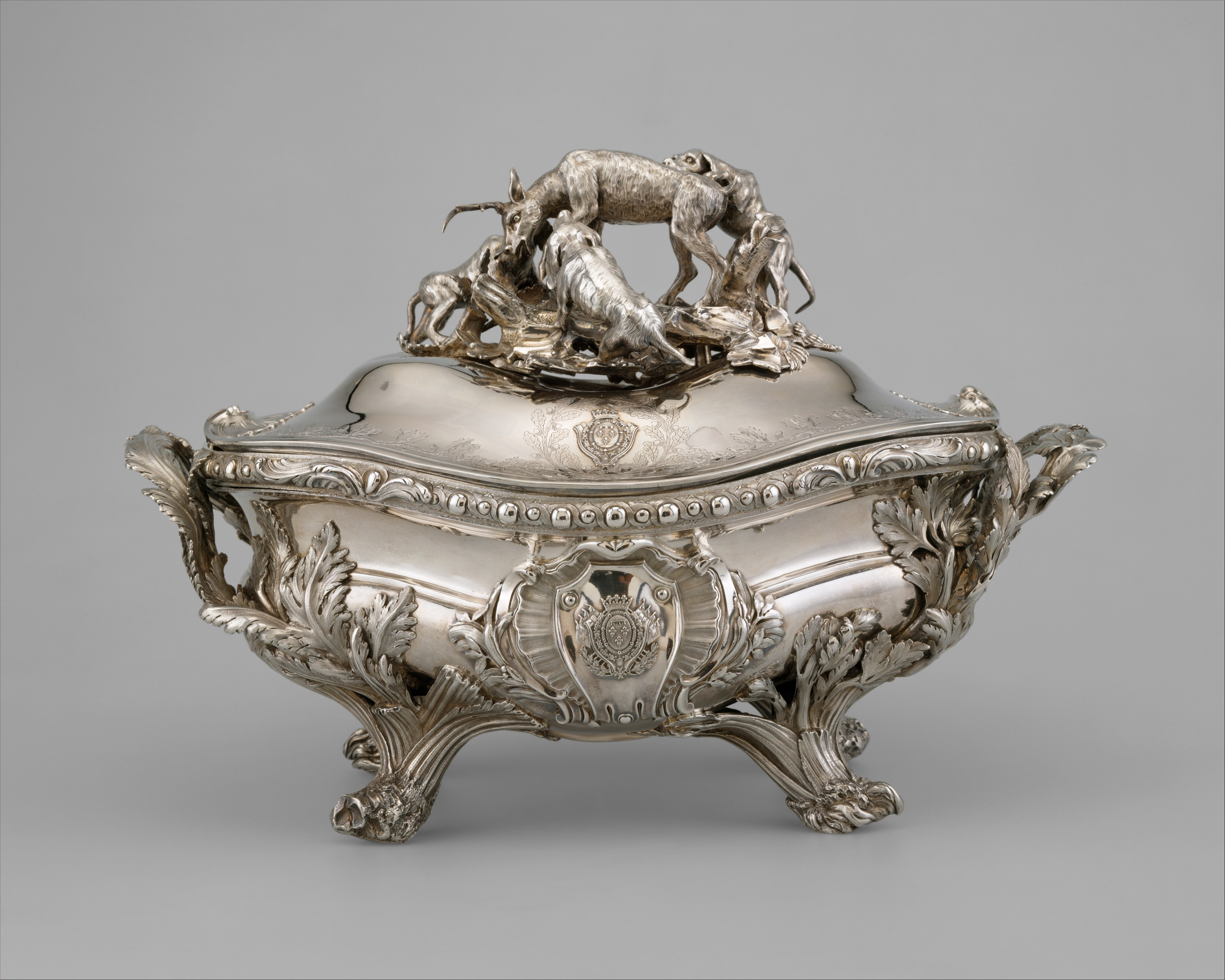
Rococo guilloché on a tureen with cover, Edme-Pierre Balzac, 1757–1759, silver, Metropolitan Museum of Art

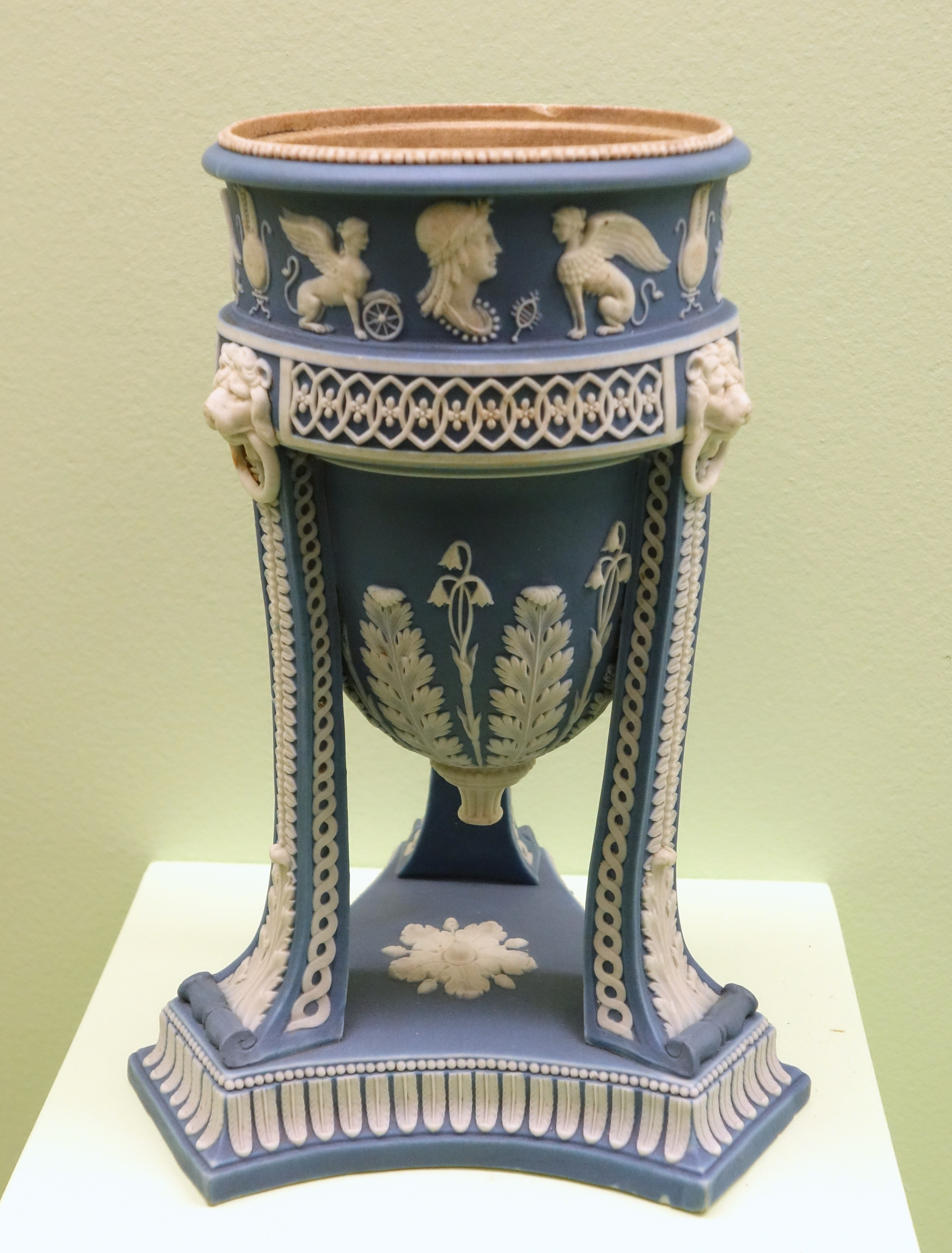
Neoclassical guillochés on a tripod vase, by Wedgwood, c.1805, jasperware, Brooklyn Museum, New York City

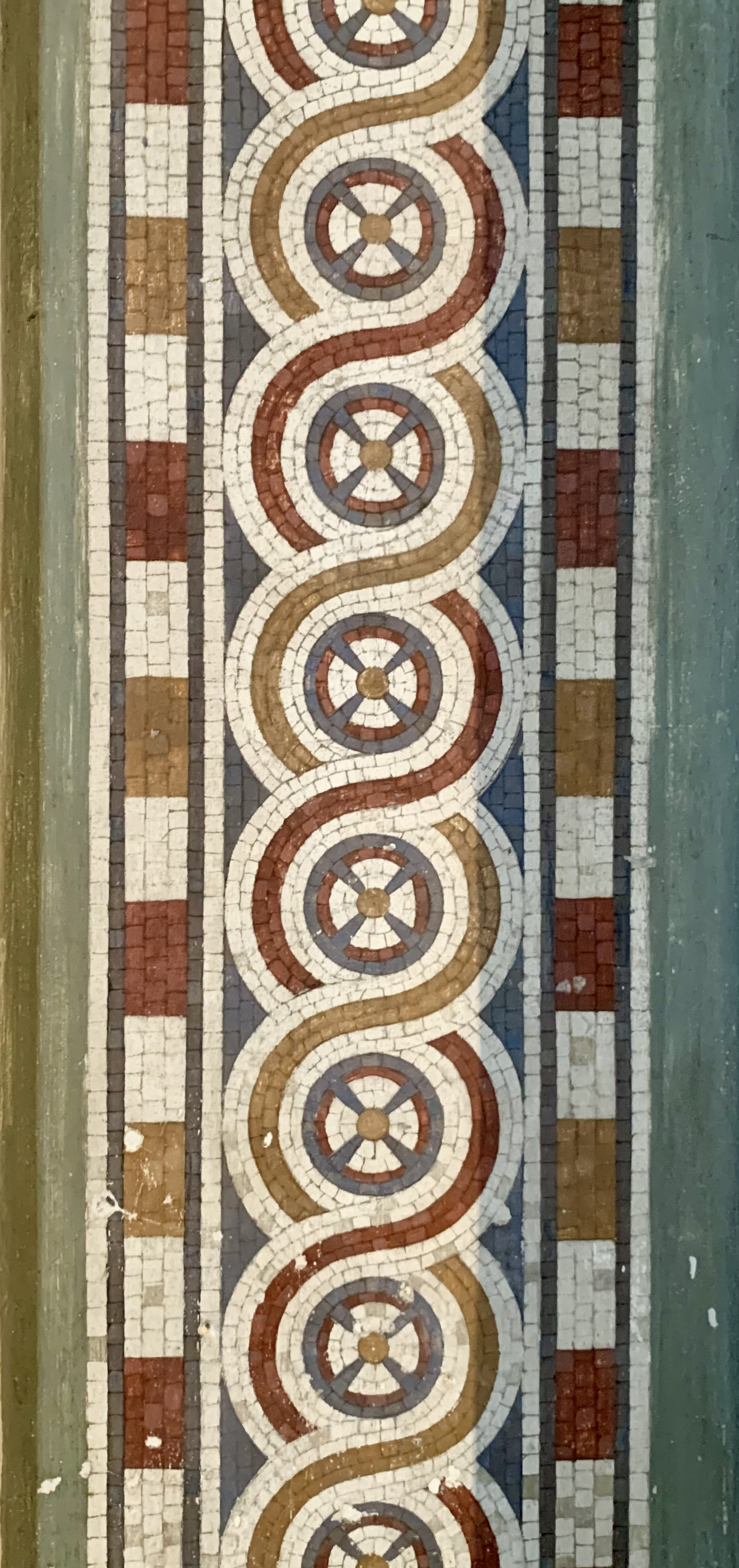
Neoclassical guilloché on a wall in the Neues Museum, Berlin, by Friedrich August Stüler, 1843-1855

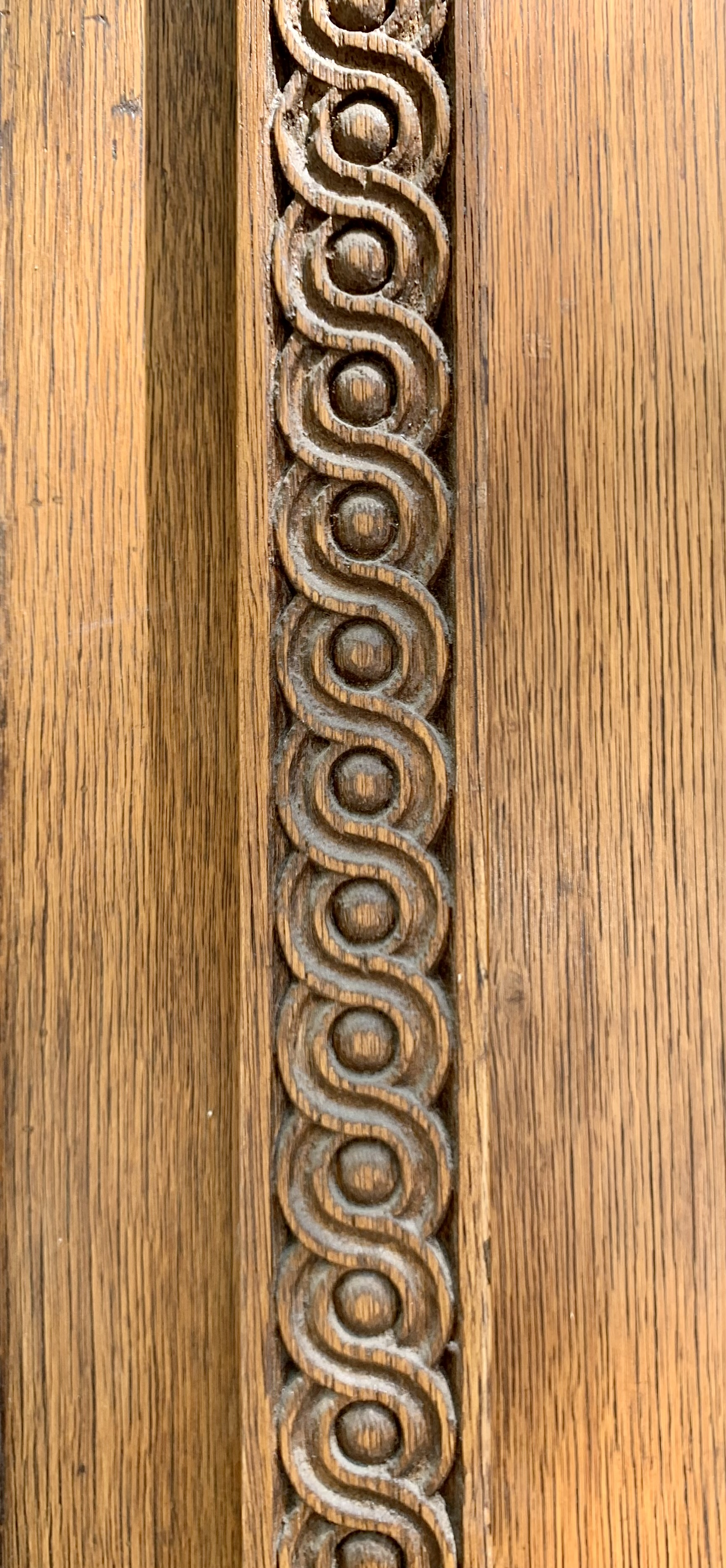
Neoclassical guilloché on the door of Strada Grigore Cobălcescu no. 6, Bucharest, Romania, unknown architect, c.1910

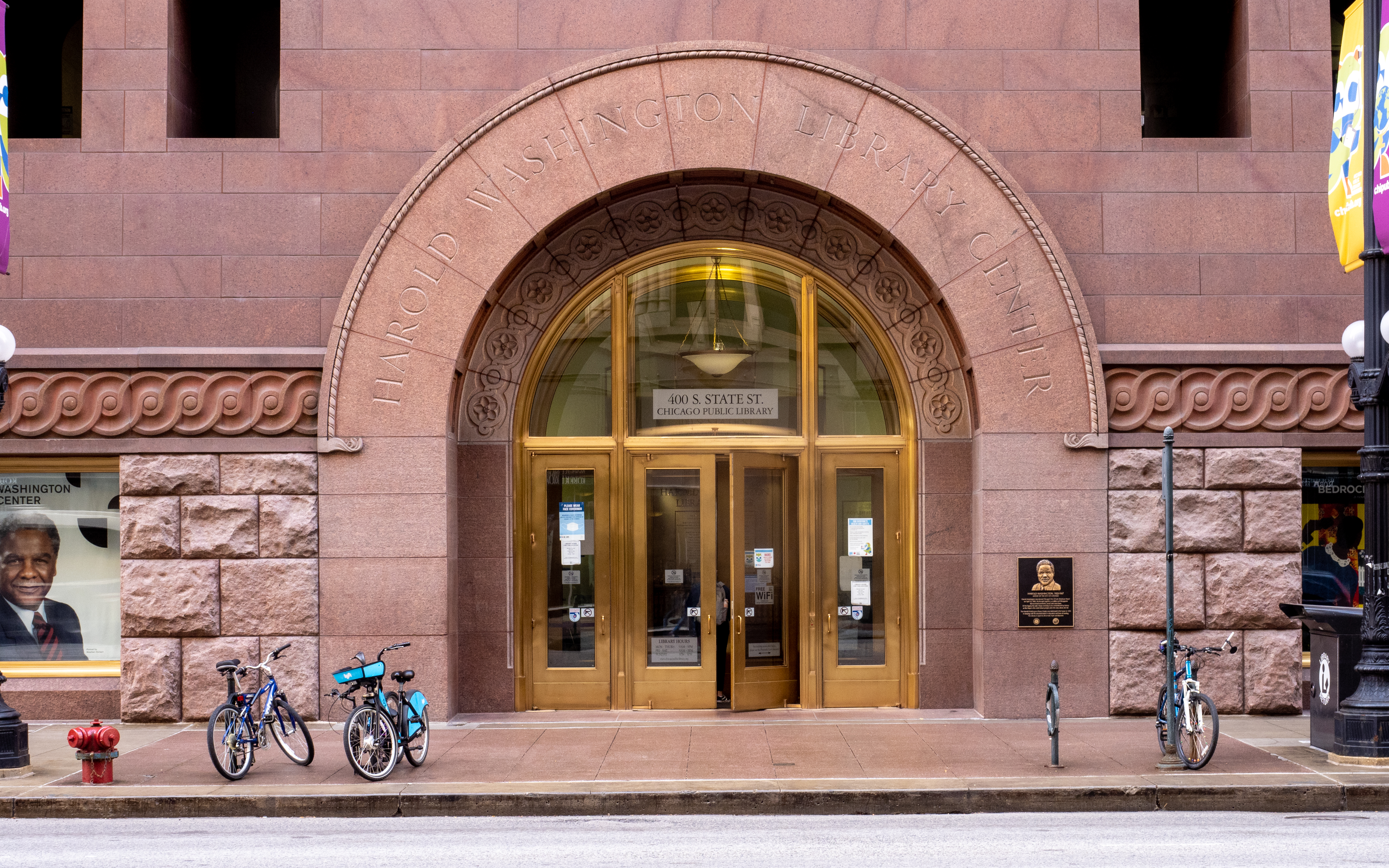
Postmodern guillochés on the Harold Washington Library, Chicago, by Hammond, Beeby & Babka, 1991

== See also ==
- Basse-taille
- Cloisonné
- Filigree
- Fretwork
- Geometric lathe
- Moire (fabric)
- Ornamental turning
- Roulette curve
- Security printing
- Spirograph
