= Theo Fabergé =

Jeweller, grandson of Carl Fabergé (1922–2007)

- Born: 26 September 1922; London
- Died: 20 August 2007 (aged 84); St Leonards-on-Sea
- Occupation: Goldsmith

Theo Fabergé (26 September 1922 – 20 August 2007) was a grandson of Peter Carl Fabergé. His father Nicholas Fabergé, Carl's youngest son, arrived in London in 1906 to help run the only branch of the House of Fabergé outside Russia, on Dover Street in London. After 1917, Nicholas remained in London, and in 1922, his son Theo was born. Like his grandfather did, Theo had a fascination with the techniques of ornamental turning, the art of deep-cut engraving and sculpting woods, ivories, gems and metals using precision lathes. This passion would lead to the creation of some of the most ornate and rare Fabergé eggs since the creation of the Imperial Fabergé Eggs by his grandfather.

== Life and career ==
From an early age, Theo Fabergé had a passion for making objects of a highly crafted standard. A fascination with the natural beauties of wood led Theo to explore the techniques of ornamental turning, the art of deep-cut engraving and sculpting woods, ivories and metals using precision lathes. He restored a Holtzappfel lathe originating from 1861, and in the 1950s began to design and make elegant objets d'art from rare wood and ivory, for pleasure and then as commissions.

Theo soon began to receive commissions from notable collectors of Carl Fabergé, and from museums such as the Virginia Museum of Fine Arts in the United States. In 1984, Theo was persuaded to produce a collection to be sold on the international market, incorporating precious metals, crystal, enamelling, stone-carving, precious gems and porcelain. The St Petersburg Collection was launched to the public in 1985 at Marshall Field's in Chicago. He was not able to refer to them as 'Fabergé eggs' due to the trademark ownership held by the then-Faberge perfume company.

Theo's daughter, Sarah Fabergé, launched her first designs for the St Petersburg Collection in 1994. Theo and his daughter Sarah worked on a variety of commissions – from the White House Egg for the United States president, to the Brotherhood Egg for Boys' Town.

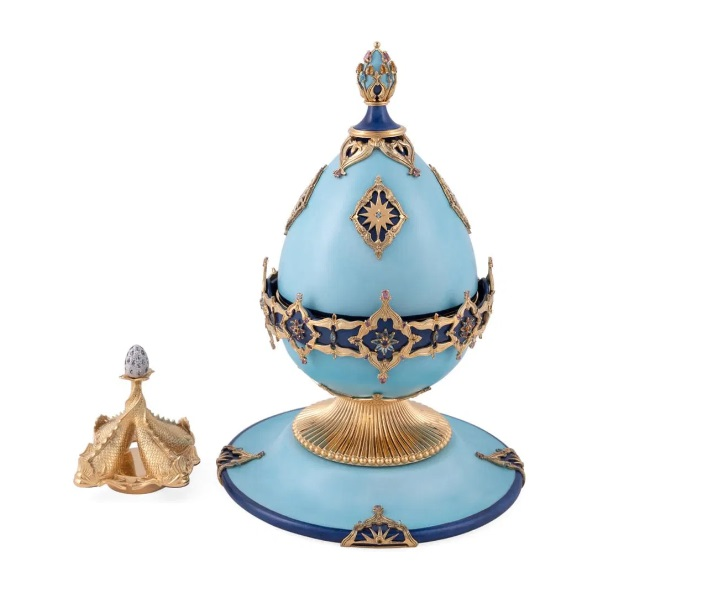
Theo Fabergé Millenium Fountain Egg, 2000.

At the time of the establishment of the St Petersburg Collection, the Duke of Gloucester admired Theo's work at 'The Art of the Master Turner' exhibition at the Science Museum in London. Princess Alexandra, The Hon Lady Ogilvy received Theo's Presentation Golden Egg. The Duke of York came aboard the vessel Sthtandart in 1999, when it arrived in the Pool of London bearing the oak for Theo's Sthtandart eggs. The Duke and Duchess of York commissioned the Hole in One Egg in aid of a children's charity. In 2003, Theo was commissioned by the Royal Air Force to produce their commemorative piece for the centenary of the Wright Brothers' first flight, the first being presented to the Duke of Edinburgh.

Among the rarest eggs created by Theo Fabergé is the Millennium Fountain Egg commissioned to honor the new millennium of which only 12 were created. The egg, made of hand-painted cerulean blue porcelain is mounted on a vermeil pedastal originally turned on Theo Fabergé’s Holtzapffel lathe and set with some 250 precious stones.

The Collection is shown in major outlets throughout the world. Museums such as the State Hermitage Museum, the San Diego Fine Arts Museum, The Royal Air Force Museum and the St Petersburg City Museum have catalogued Theo Fabergé's creations within their collections.
