= Straight line engine turning =

Machine tool used for engraving

A straight line engine turning machine is a machine used for engraving decorative patterns on a surface. The engraving may be referred to as Guilloché, which also encompasses patterns created with the rose engine lathe. Where the rose engine is based on a lathe, the straight line engine has more in common with a metal planer machine.

The straight line engine turning machine commonly consisted of an upright slide, a cross slide, a slide rest which holds the cutting tool, and a pattern bar holder
