= Millennium Fountain Egg =

2000 jewelled Fabergé egg

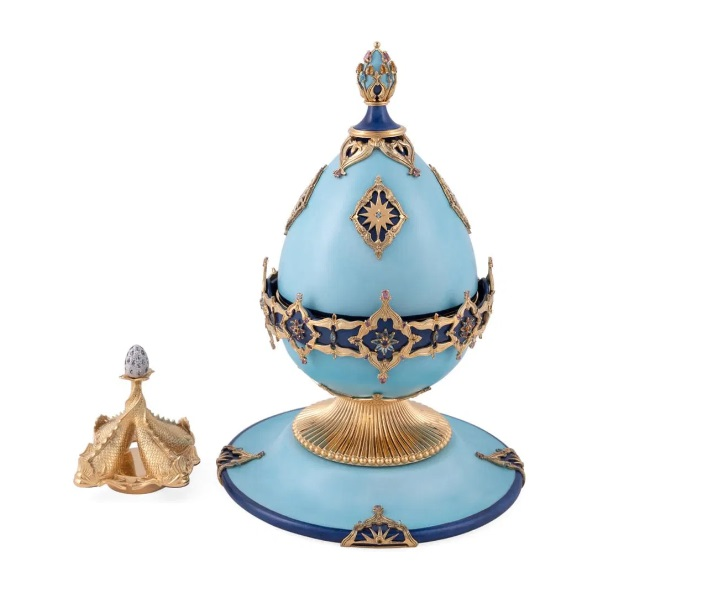
Theo Fabergé Millennium Fountain Egg (2000)

The Millennium Fountain egg is a jewelled Fabergé egg made under the supervision of the jeweler, Theo Fabergé, grandson of Peter Carl Fabergé, in 2000. The egg was made to commemorate the start of the Third Millennium.

Fabergé crafted only 12 of these eggs, marking them as among the rarest of Theo Fabergé's creations.
