= Geometric lathe =

Engraving device

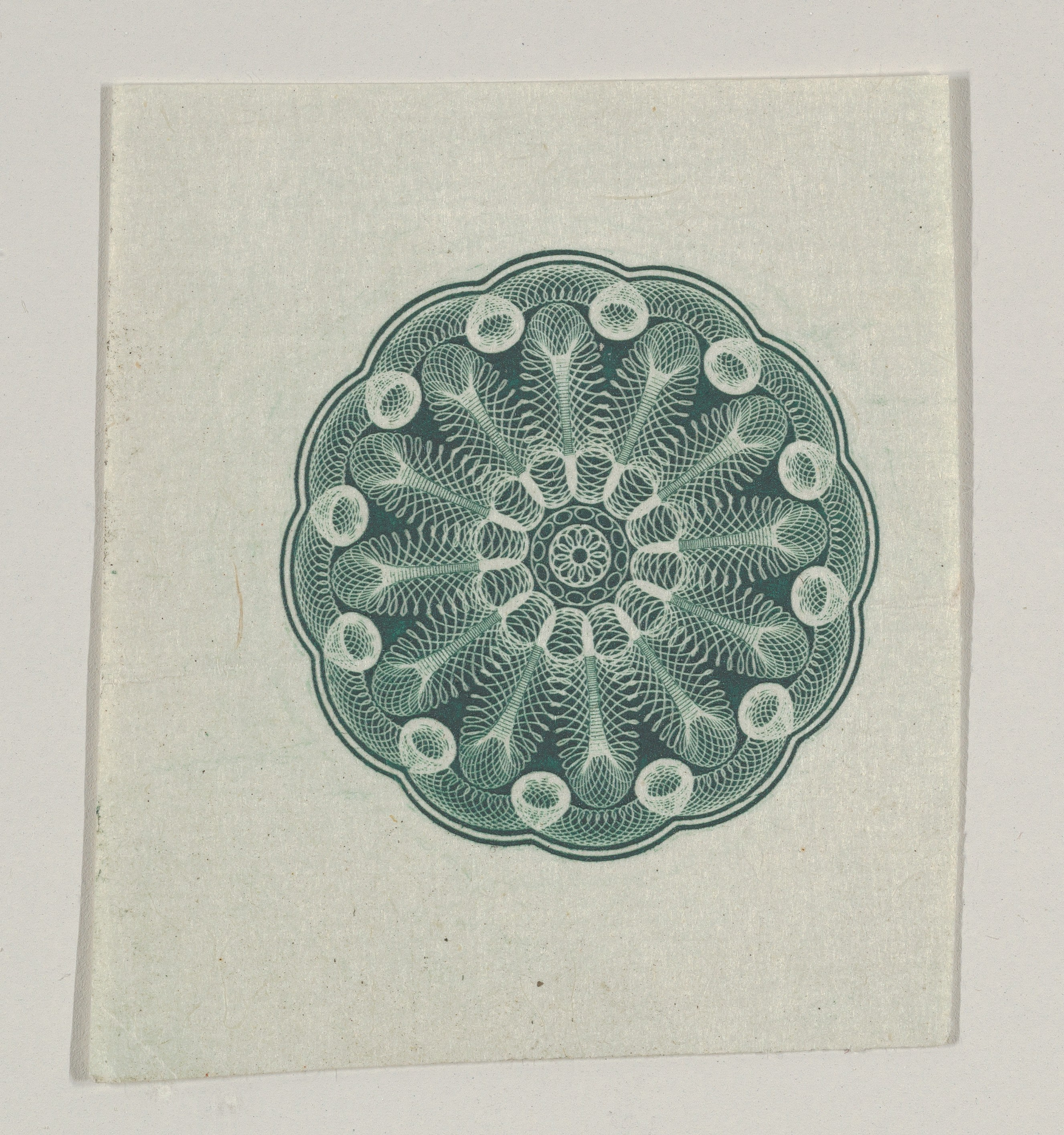
Banknote motif created with a geometric lathe

A geometric lathe was used for making ornamental patterns on the plates used in printing bank notes and postage stamps. It is sometimes called a guilloché lathe.

== History ==
It was developed early in the nineteenth century when efforts were introduced to combat forgery, and is an adaptation of an ornamental turning lathe.

The lathe was able to generate intersecting and interlacing patterns of fine lines in various shapes, which were almost impossible to forge by hand-engraving. They were used by many national mints.

== See also ==
- Rose engine
- Security printing
- Guilloché
- Spirograph
- Tusi couple
