= Rocker cover =

Engine part

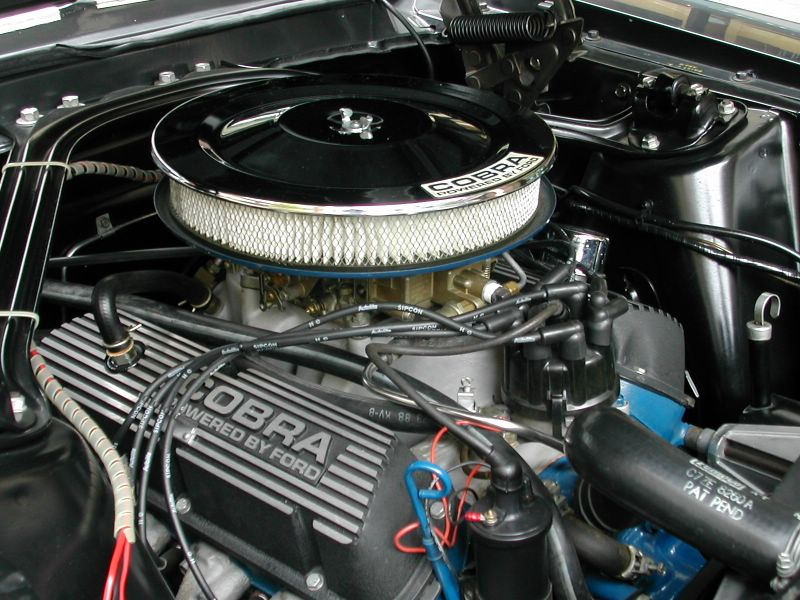
A Shelby Mustang Windsor V8 engine with "Cobra Powered by Ford" labeled rocker (valve) cover (lower left)

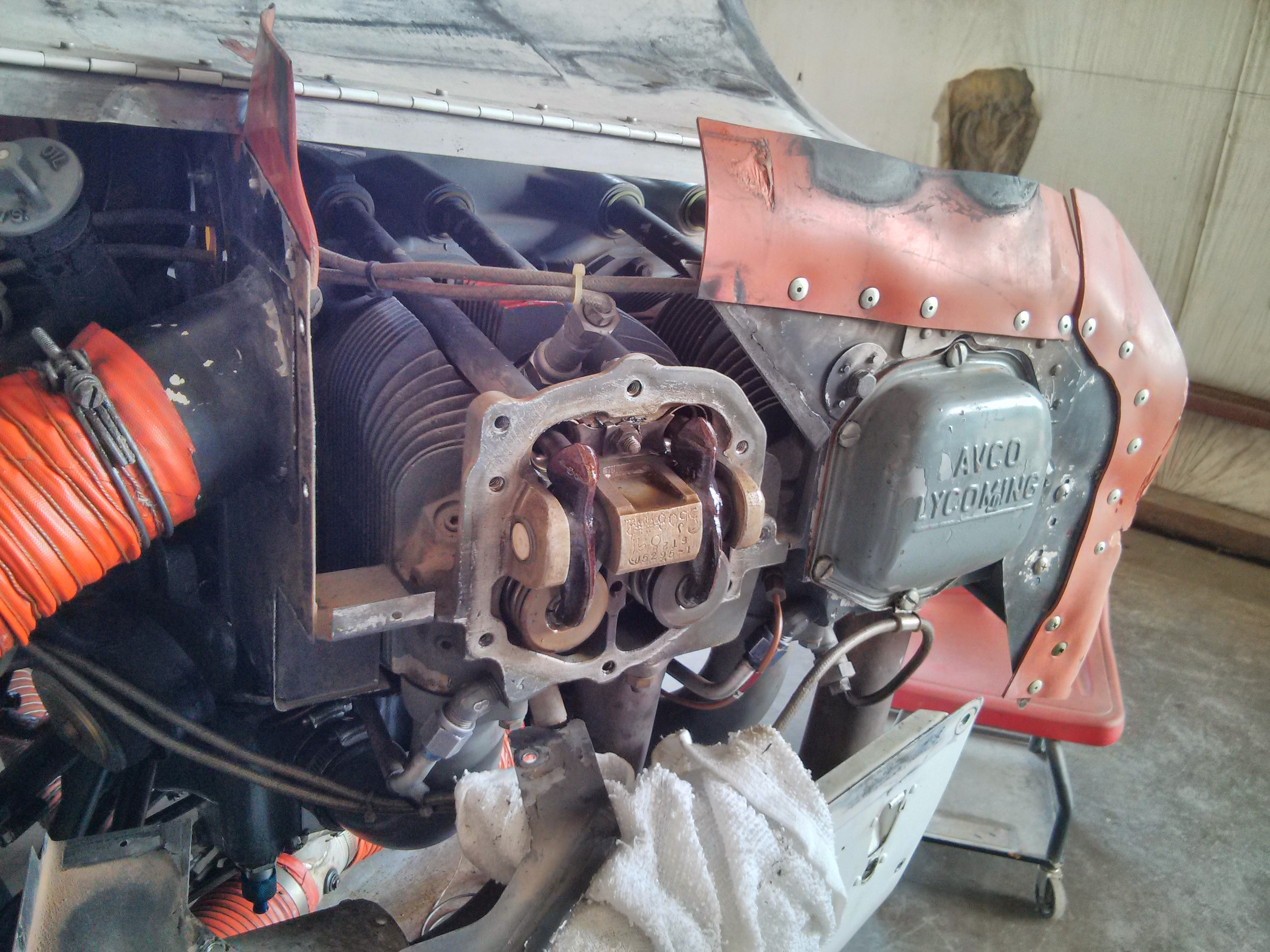
A 4-cylinder Lycoming O-320 aircraft engine, with the rocker box cover of one cylinder (of the two visible) removed to expose its rocker arms for inspection

A rocker cover, or valve cover (US/Canada) is a cover that encloses the rocker arm in an internal combustion engine, bolting with a gasket seal to the engine head. Engines with more than one head (such as a V8) will have multiple rocker covers. On engines without rocker arms, such as some overhead cam and most dual overhead cam types, they are known as rocker boxes in the United Kingdom.

On modern engines without rocker arms they are internationally known as "valve cover" but are sometimes referred to as a "cam cover" or "timing cover" if they also cover the timing gear(s) and belt or chain.

Very large multi-cylinder engines, such as those used in a ship or in aviation, may have one rocker cover for each cylinder, to make removal and installation more manageable.

== History ==
Rocker covers did not exist in early engines, which had exposed intake and exhaust valves (for ease of lubrication). With the advance of central lubrication rocker covers were added to keep the oil in and dirt out. They are effectively ubiquitous today.

== Rocker cover gasket ==
A rocker cover gasket (valve cover gasket in the US and Canada) is used to seal the joint between the cover and engine head. Failure of the gasket can cause oil to leak from the engine. A head gasket is used to seal the joint between the head and the engine block.
