= Ornamental turning =

Ornamental turning is a type of turning, a craft that involves cutting of a work mounted in a lathe. The work can be made of any material that is suitable for being cut in this way, such as wood, bone, ivory or metal. Plain turning is work executed on a lathe where a transverse section through any part of the work comprises a plain circle. Ornamental turning, also called Complex turning, is executed on a lathe with attachments which convert that plain circular section to variants of outline; these range from a simple series of cuts taken at intervals around the work (so producing grooves or bumps on the surface) to non-circular movements whereby the whole of the circular shape is removed to give a completely different form. Such shapes are achieved by various means, the principal ones being:

- Cutting with a fixed or revolving cutter while the work is rotated on a non-radial path, e.g.- eccentrically, elliptically, epicyclically or, following a path determined by a template or reciprocating device
- Cutting with a revolving cutter while the work remains static, then partially rotating the work and holding it in each new position (using an indexing device) so as to produce a series of cuts at intervals around the cylinder or surface
- Cutting with a fixed or revolving cutter while the work is rotated on a radial or non-radial path and the cutting apparatus follows a linear, circular or non-circular motion, the two motions being synchronised by gearing.

== History ==
Ornamental turning is believed to have originated in Bavaria in the latter part of the 15th century when it consisted mostly of rose-work, being done by using a cam or template (called a rosette) mounted on the lathe spindle and allowing the headstock to rock under tension of a spring or weight, to follow the contour on the edge of the rosette: also the spindle was allowed to slide to and fro endwise under tension of another spring, or weight, to follow the contour on the face of the rosette. Thus, as the work was rotated it rocked and traversed so that the cutting tool produced wavy lines upon the surface or the cylinder. Before the end of the 18th century, cutting tools were generally hand-held or clamped to a fixed 'rest'. The slide rest, which allows the cutter to slide along the rest under control of a leadscrew, although invented before 1480, was not in general use until much later. It is clear from surviving examples of their work that the skill of the early turners was highly developed.

In response to growing interest by wealthy and great patrons, including several of the royal families of Europe, two great works on the art and science of turning were published in France:. Meanwhile, turning technology was being developed in England where the practice of arresting the work from point to point (by a division plate) and applying a revolving cutter (held in an improved slide rest) was employed. By the beginning of the 19th century John Jacob Holtzapffel had established his workshop in London and built a reputation as a maker of high-class lathes and tools. Many of his customers were among the monarchs and nobility of Europe and England became the world centre for the pastime of ornamental turning. The Holtzapffel firm continued to make lathes until 1927 by which time they had produced a total of 2557, serially numbered, many of which were equipped for ornamental turning. Other engineers copied or varied his designs but none were so prolific in their manufacture.

The hobby of ornamental turning declined rapidly following the invention of the motor-car which, by the end of the First World War, had become the fashionable pastime of the mechanically minded amateur, and the lathes with their complex equipment were abandoned. Relatively few of these mechanical marvels survive today and hardly any are complete with all their original accessories. However, the hobby is still kept alive by a small band of enthusiasts, notably the Society of Ornamental Turners, founded in 1948 and based in England but with members world-wide; new groups have since been established, principally in the United States, Australia and New Zealand. The members of all these societies seek to develop the knowledge of ornamental turning and to restore, maintain and use the old equipment or, to adapt modern lathes for ornamental turning. Some are even bringing the hobby right up-to-date by building computer-controlled O.T. lathes.

== Holtzapffel and other books ==
The accepted definitive published work on ornamental turning is the book Turning and Mechanical Manipulation, by Charles and John Jacob Holtzapffel. Volume 5, entitled “The Principles and Practice of Ornamental or Complex Turning” is considered to be the bible of ornamental turning but there is much related information in the other volumes. Other useful books include: Ornamental Turning, by J.H.Evans, The Lathe & Its Uses, by J Lukin Ornamental Turning, by T D Walshaw, and Holtzapffel Volume VI by John F.Edwards, 2013. Reprints of all these books are usually obtainable.

The Society of Ornamental Turners was founded in 1948 with the object to encourage, develop and promote the study and practice of the art and science of ornamental turning. Its members meet quarterly in London to display examples of their work, share their experiences and attend a lecture or demonstration. Seminars and outings to places of interest are also arranged. A bulletin containing articles on all aspects of ornamental turning and news of the society is published half-yearly in March and September and a newsletter in July and December. The society maintains a website: The Society of Ornamental Turners which contains much information about this pastime together with a gallery of pictures of ornamentally turned objects. Competitions are held annually for ornamental turning, plain turning, making equipment, displays at meetings, contributions to the bulletin and for advancing the knowledge of the art.

Over many years a close association has been formed between the Society and the Worshipful Company of Turners of London and several members of the Society are Freemen or Liverymen of the Worshipful Company. From time to time the Worshipful Company holds competitions which include categories open specifically to members of the Society.

== See also ==
- Potter's wheel
- Rose engine lathe
- Elliptical turning
