= Rose engine lathe =

Specialized geometric lathe

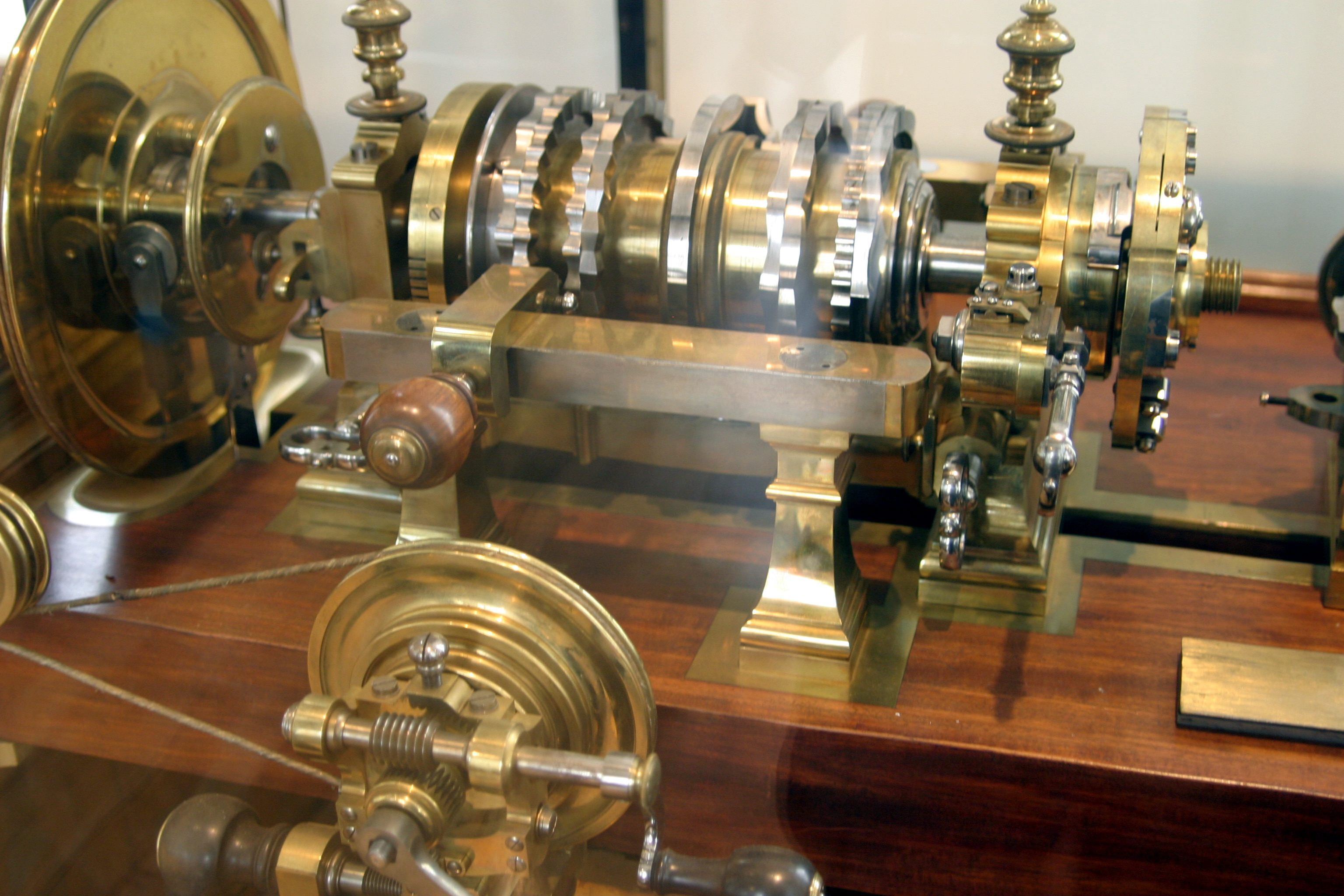
Mercklein's rose engine, 1780

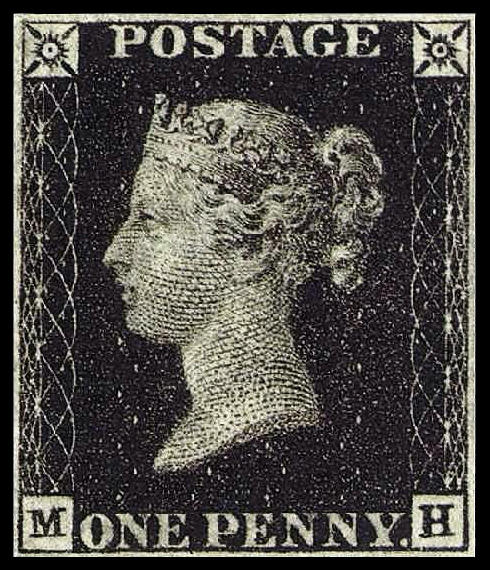
A rose engine was used to produce the complex background and border patterns of early British postage stamps

A rose engine lathe is a specialized kind of geometric lathe. The head stock rocks back and forth with a rocking motion and/or slides along the spindle axis in a pumping motion. A rosette or cam-like pattern mounted on the spindle is controlled by moving against a cam follower(s) while the lathe spindle rotates. Rose engine work can make flower patterns, as well as convoluted, symmetrical, multi-lobed geometric patterns. The patterns it produces are similar to that of a Spirograph, in metal. No other ornamental lathe can produce these "rose" patterns. The decoration produced by a rose engine lathe is called guilloche. It sometimes confused with "jewel finishes" or engine turning, a much cheaper process of making swirly marks in metal by a rotating abrasive peg or pad, which is repeatedly applied to the surface to make a pattern of overlapping circles. Jewel finishes used to be common on stereo faceplates and automobile interiors.

The patterns of United Kingdom's first postage stamps (known as the "line engraved" series), including the Penny Black of 1840, were based on rose engine patterns. The die used to prepare the printing plates was partially created by means of the rose engine, which produced a complicated pattern on a separate piece of metal. Rollers were then used to transfer this pattern to the die, where it formed the background and border patterns (the head, corner decoration and lettering were hand-engraved). This pattern made the stamps difficult to forge, and PB&P (known from 1852 as Perkins, Bacon & Co.) held the contract for forty years, during which time the designs of the stamps which they printed changed little.

Karl Faberge used the rose engine to create his signature decoration, guilloché enameling, for his famous Fabergé eggs created for Tsar Alexander III of Russia. The rose engine cut a series of parallel lines into the metal surface onto which the enamel was applied.
