= Newton's minimal resistance problem =

Mathematical problem

Newton's minimal resistance problem is a problem of finding a solid of revolution which experiences a minimum resistance when it moves through a homogeneous fluid with constant velocity in the direction of the axis of revolution, named after Isaac Newton, who posed and solved the problem in 1685 and published it in 1687 in his Principia Mathematica. The problem initiated the field of the calculus of variations, as Newton introduced the concept of calculus of variations, with the problem being the first to be formulated and correctly solved, appearing a decade before the brachistochrone problem, in which Newton also solved using the calculus of variations. Newton published the solution in Principia Mathematica without his derivation, and David Gregory was the first person who approached Newton and persuaded him to write an analysis for him. Then the derivation was shared with his students and peers by Gregory.

According to I. Bernard Cohen, in his Guide to Newton’s Principia, "The key to Newton’s reasoning was found in the 1880s, when the earl of Portsmouth gave his family’s vast collection of Newton’s scientific and mathematical papers to Cambridge University. Among Newton’s manuscripts they found the draft text of a letter, … in which Newton elaborated his mathematical argument. [This] was never fully understood, however, until the publication of the major manuscript documents by D. T. Whiteside [1974], whose analytical and historical commentary has enabled students of Newton not only to follow fully Newton’s path to discovery and proof, but also Newton’s later (1694) recomputation of the surface of least resistance".

Even though Newton's model for the fluid was wrong as per our current understanding, the fluid he had considered finds its application in hypersonic flow theory as a limiting case.

== Definition ==
In Proposition 34 of Book 2 of the Principia, Newton wrote: "If in a rare medium, consisting of equal particles freely disposed at equal distances from each other, a globe and a cylinder described on equal diameter move with equal velocities in the direction of the axis of the cylinder, the resistance of the globe will be but half as great as that of the cylinder."

Following this proposition is a scholium containing the famous condition that the curve, when rotated about its axis, should generate the solid that experiences less resistance than any other solid having a fixed length and width.

In modern form, Newton's problem is to minimize the following integral:

where represents the curve which generates a solid when it is rotated about the x axis, and

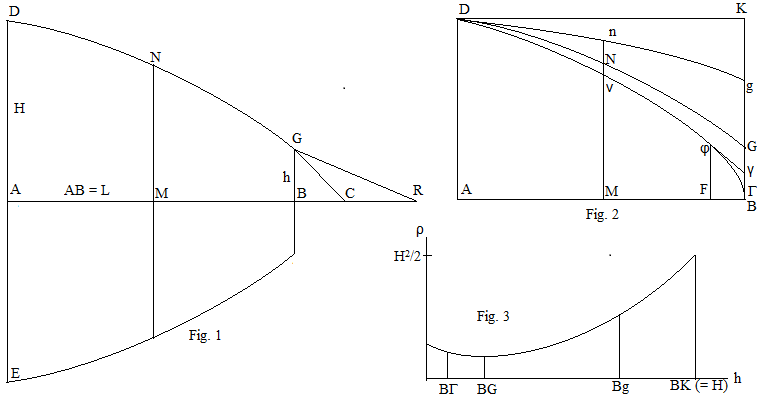
Newton's definition of the solution space, with the flat "bullet" head parameterized by shown to be nonzero in Fig. 3

I is the reduction in resistance caused by the particles impinging upon the sloping surface DNG, formed by rotating the curve, instead of perpendicularly upon the horizontal projection of DNG on the rear disc DA from the direction of motion, in Fig. 1. Note that the front of the solid is the disc BG, the triangles GBC and GBR are not part of it, but are used below by Newton to express the minimum condition.

This integral is related to the total resistance experienced by the body by the following relation:

The problem is to find the curve that generates the solid that experiences less resistance than any other solid having a fixed axial length L and a fixed width H.

Since the solid must taper in the direction of motion, H is the radius of the disc forming the rear surface of the curve rotated about the x axis. The units are chosen so that the constant of proportionality is unity. Also, note that and the integral, which is evaluated between x = 0 and x = L is negative. Let y = h when x = L.

When the curve is the horizontal line DK, so the solid is a cylinder, the integral is zero, and the resistance of the cylinder is which explains the constant term.

== Condition for a minimum resistance solid ==
The simplest way to apply the Euler–Lagrange equation to this problem is to rewrite the resistance as

where, and the integral, which is evaluated between y = H and y = h < H, is negative.

Substituting the integrand into the Euler–Lagrange equation

and it follows that is constant, and this can be written as

where, and is a constant.

Although the curves that satisfy the minimum condition cannot be described by a simple function y = f(x), they may be plotted using p as a parameter, to obtain the corresponding coordinates (x, y) of the curves. The equation of x as a function of p is obtained from the minimum condition (1), and an equivalent of it was first found by Newton.

Differentiating:

and integrating:

where is a constant.

Since when, and when, the constants can be determined in terms of H, h and L. Because y from equation (1) can never be zero or negative, the front surface of any solid satisfying the minimum condition must be a disc (GB in Fig. 2 above).

As this was the first example of this type of problem, Newton had to invent a completely new method of solution. Also, he went much deeper in his analysis of the problem than simply finding the condition (1).

== Solid experiencing least resistance ==
While a solid of least resistance must satisfy (1), the converse is not true. Fig. 2 shows the family of curves that satisfy it for different values of. As increases the radius, Bg = h, of the disc at x = L decreases and the curve becomes steeper.

Directly before the minimum resistance problem, Newton stated that if on any elliptical or oval figure rotated about its axis, p becomes greater than unity, one with less resistance can be found. This is achieved by replacing the part of the solid that has p > 1 with the frustum of a cone whose vertex angle is a right angle, as shown in Fig. 2 for curve. This has less resistance than. Newton does not prove this, but adds that it might have applications in shipbuilding. Whiteside supplies a proof and contends that Newton would have used the same reasoning.

In Fig. 2, since the solid generated from the curve Dng satisfies the minimum condition and has p < 1 at g, it experiences less resistance than that from any other curve with the same end point g. However, for the curve DνΓ, with p > 1 at end point Γ, this is not the case for although the curve satisfies the minimum condition, the resistance experienced by φγ and γΓ together is less than that by φΓ.

Newton concluded that of all solids that satisfy the minimum resistance condition, the one experiencing the least resistance, DNG in Fig. 2, is the one that has p = 1 at G. This is shown schematically in Fig. 3 where the overall resistance of the solid varies against the radius of the front surface disc, the minimum occurring when h = BG, corresponding to p = 1 at G.

In the Principia, in Fig. 1 the condition for the minimum resistance solid is translated into a geometric form as follows: draw GR parallel to the tangent at N, so that, and equation (1) becomes:

At G,,, and, so which appears in the Principia in the form:

== Newton's derivation of the minimum resistance condition ==
Although this appears fairly simple, it has several subtleties that have caused much confusion.

In Fig 4, assume DNSG is the curve that when rotated about AB generates the solid whose resistance is less than any other such solid with the same heights, AD = H, BG = h and length, AB = L.

Fig. 5. shows the infinitesimal region of the curve about N and I in more detail. Although NI, Nj and NJ are really curved, they can be approximated by straight lines provided NH is sufficiently small.

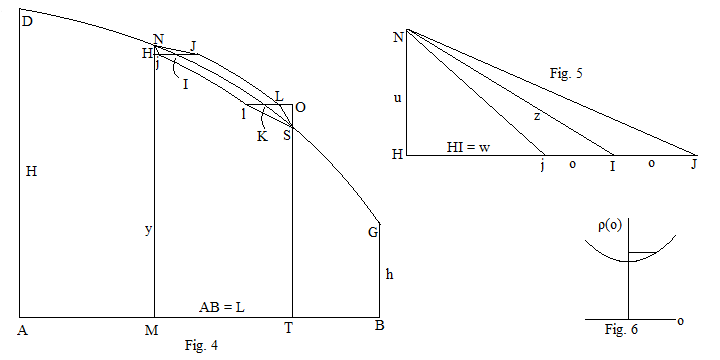

Let HM = y, AM = x, NH = u, and HI = w = dx. Let the tangent at each point on the curve,. The reduction of the resistance of the sloping ring NI compared to the vertical ring NH rotated about AB is (2)

Let the minimum resistance solid be replaced by an identical one, except that the arc between points I and K is shifted by a small distance to the right, or to the left, as shown in more detail in Fig. 5. In either case, HI becomes.

The resistance of the arcs of the curve DN and SG are unchanged. Also, the resistance of the arc IK is not changed by being shifted, since the slope remains the same along its length. The only change to the overall resistance of DNSG is due to the change to the gradient of arcs NI and KS. The 2 displacements have to be equal for the slope of the arc IK to be unaffected, and the new curve to end at G.

The new resistance due to particles impinging upon NJ or Nj, rather that NI is:

+ w.(terms in ascending powers of starting with the 2nd).

The result is a change of resistance of: + higher order terms, the resistance being reduced if o > 0 (NJ less resisted than NI).

This is the original 1685 derivation where he obtains the above result using the series expansion in powers of o. In his 1694 revisit he differentiates (2) with respect to w. He sent details of his later approach to David Gregory, and these are included as an appendix in Motte’s translation of the Principia.

Similarly, the change in resistance due to particles impinging upon SL or Sl rather that SK is: + higher order terms.

The overall change in the resistance of the complete solid, + w.(terms in ascending powers of starting with the 2nd).

Fig 6 represents the total resistance of DNJLSG, or DNjlSG as a function of o. Since the original curve DNIKSG has the least resistance, any change o of whatever sign, must result in an increase in the resistance. This is only possible if the coefficient of o in the expansion of is zero, so:

(2)

If this was not the case, it would be possible to choose a value of o with a sign that produced a curve DNJLSG, or DNjlSG with less resistance than the original curve, contrary to the initial assumption. The approximation of taking straight lines for the finite arcs, NI and KS becomes exact in the limit as HN and OS approach zero. Also, NM and HM can be taken as equal, as can OT and ST.

However, N and S on the original curve are arbitrary points, so for any 2 points anywhere on the curve the above equality must apply. This is only possible if in the limit of any infinitesimal arc HI, anywhere on the curve, the expression,

is a constant. (3)

This has to be the case since, if was to vary along the curve, it would be possible to find 2 infinitesimal arcs NI and KS such that (2) was false, and the coefficient of o in the expansion of would be non-zero. Then a solid with less resistance could be produced by choosing a suitable value of o.

This is the reason for the constant term in the minimum condition in (3). As noted above, Newton went further, and claimed that the resistance of the solid is less than that of any other with the same length and width, when the slope at G is equal to unity. Therefore, in this case, the constant in (3) is equal to one quarter of the radius of the front disc of the solid,.
