= Beltrami identity =

Special case of the Euler–Lagrange equations

The Beltrami identity, named after Eugenio Beltrami, is a special case of the Euler–Lagrange equation in the calculus of variations.

The Euler–Lagrange equation serves to extremize action functionals of the form

$$I[u]=\int_a^b L[x,u(x),u'(x)] \, dx \, ,$$

where $a$ and $b$ are constants and $u'(x) = \frac{du}{dx}$.

If $\frac{\partial L}{\partial x} = 0$, then the Euler–Lagrange equation reduces to the Beltrami identity,

$L-u'\frac{\partial L}{\partial u'}=C \, ,$

where C is a constant. (Note: Thus, the Legendre transform of the Lagrangian, the Hamiltonian, is constant along the dynamical path.)

== Derivation ==
By the chain rule, the derivative of L is

$$\frac{dL}{dx} = \frac{\partial L}{\partial x} \frac{dx}{dx} + \frac{\partial L}{\partial u} \frac{du}{dx} +  \frac{\partial L}{\partial u'} \frac{du'}{dx} \, .$$

Because $\frac{\partial L}{\partial x} = 0$, we write

$$\frac{dL}{dx} = \frac{\partial L}{\partial u} u' +  \frac{\partial L}{\partial u'} u'' \, .$$

We have an expression for $\frac{\partial L}{\partial u}$ from the Euler–Lagrange equation,

$$\frac{\partial L}{\partial u} = \frac{d}{dx} \frac{\partial L}{\partial u'} \,$$

that we can substitute in the above expression for $\frac{dL}{dx}$ to obtain

$$\frac{dL}{dx} =u'\frac{d}{dx} \frac{\partial L}{\partial u'} + u''\frac{\partial L}{\partial u'} \, .$$

By the product rule, the right side is equivalent to

$$\frac{dL}{dx} = \frac{d}{dx} \left( u' \frac{\partial L}{\partial u'} \right) \, .$$

By integrating both sides and putting both terms on one side, we get the Beltrami identity,

$$L - u'\frac{\partial L}{\partial u'} = C \, .$$

== Applications ==
=== Solution to the brachistochrone problem ===
The solution to the brachistochrone problem is the cycloid.

An example of an application of the Beltrami identity is the brachistochrone problem, which involves finding the curve $y = y(x)$ that minimizes the integral

$$I[y] = \int_0^a \sqrt { {1+y'^{\, 2}} \over y } dx \, .$$

The integrand

$$L(y,y') = \sqrt{ {1+y'^{\, 2}} \over y }$$

does not depend explicitly on the variable of integration $x$, so the Beltrami identity applies,

$$L-y'\frac{\partial L}{\partial y'}=C \, .$$

Substituting for $L$ and simplifying,

$$y(1+y'^{\, 2}) = 1/C^2  ~~\text {(constant)} \, ,$$

which can be solved with the result put in the form of parametric equations

$$x = A(\phi - \sin \phi)$$
$$y = A(1 - \cos \phi)$$

with $A$ being half the above constant, $\frac{1}{2C^{2}}$, and $\phi$ being a variable. These are the parametric equations for a cycloid.

=== Solution to the catenary problem ===
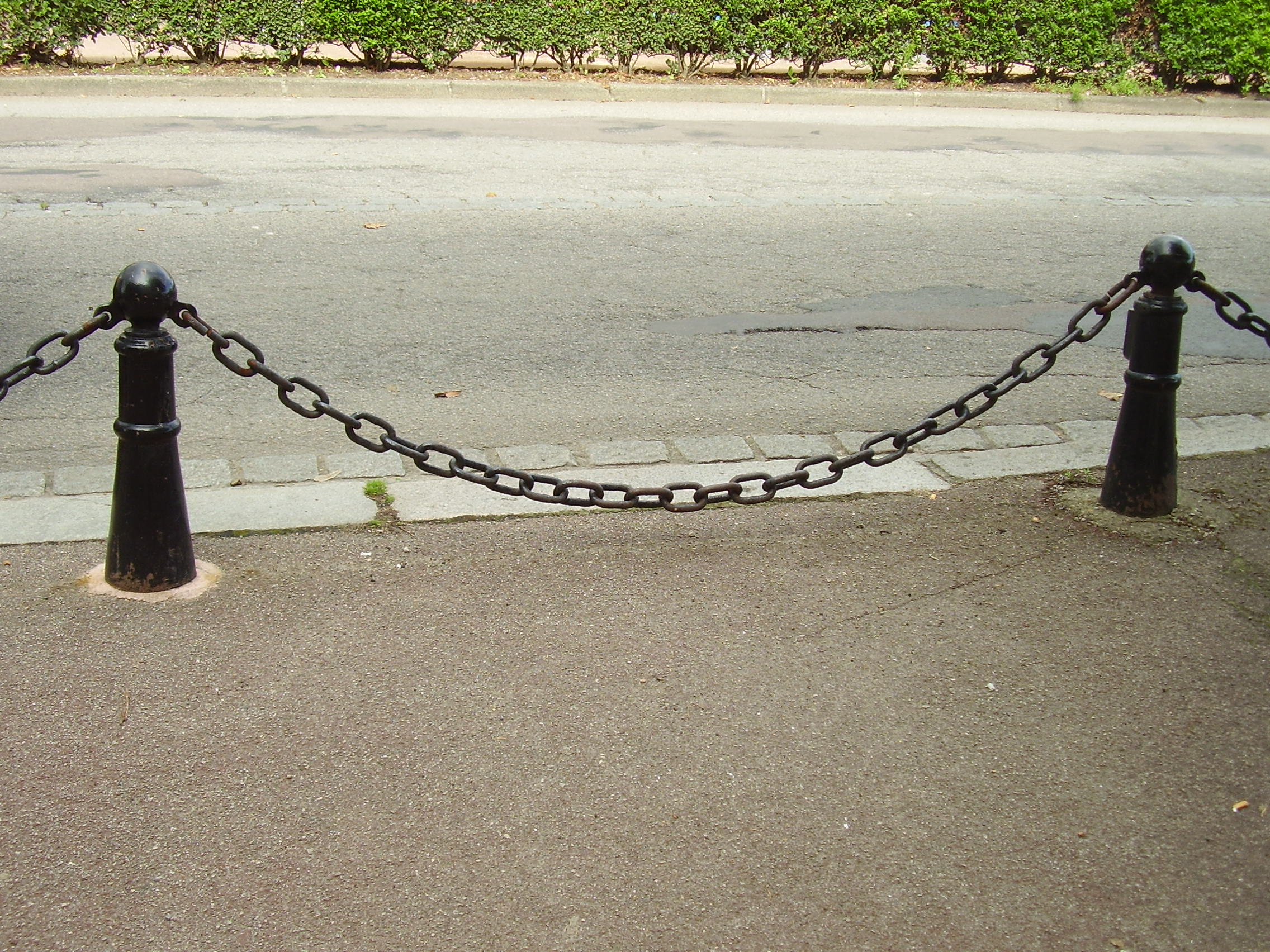
A chain hanging from points forms a catenary.

Consider a string with uniform density $\mu$ of length $l$ suspended from two points of equal height and at distance $D$. By the formula for arc length,
$$l = \int_S dS = \int_{s_1}^{s_2} \sqrt{1+y'^2}dx,$$
where $S$ is the path of the string, and $s_1$ and $s_2$ are the boundary conditions.

The curve has to minimize its potential energy
$$U = \int_S g\mu y\cdot dS = \int_{s_1}^{s_2} g\mu y\sqrt{1+y'^2} dx,$$
and is subject to the constraint
$$\int_{s_1}^{s_2} \sqrt{1+y'^2} dx = l ,$$
where $g$ is the force of gravity.

Because the independent variable $x$ does not appear in the integrand, the Beltrami identity may be used to express the path of the string as a separable first order differential equation

$$L - y\prime \frac{\partial L}{\partial y\prime} = \mu gy\sqrt{1+y\prime ^2} + \lambda \sqrt{1+y\prime ^2} - \left[\mu gy\frac{y\prime ^2}{\sqrt{1+y\prime ^2}} + \lambda \frac{y\prime ^2}{\sqrt{1+y\prime ^2}}\right] = C,$$
where $\lambda$ is the Lagrange multiplier.

It is possible to simplify the differential equation as such:
$$\frac{g\rho y - \lambda }{\sqrt{1+y'^2}} = C.$$

Solving this equation gives the hyperbolic cosine, where $C_0$ is a second constant obtained from integration

$$y = \frac{C}{\mu g}\cosh \left[ \frac{\mu g}{C} (x + C_0) \right] - \frac{\lambda}{\mu g}.$$

The three unknowns $C$, $C_0$, and $\lambda$ can be solved for using the constraints for the string's endpoints and arc length $l$, though a closed-form solution is often very difficult to obtain.
