= Tautochrone curve =

Curve for which the time to roll to the end is equal for all starting points

Four balls slide down a cycloid curve from different positions, but they arrive at the bottom at the same time. The blue arrows show the points' acceleration along the curve. On the top is the time-position diagram.

A tautochrone curve or isochrone curve (from Ancient Greek ταὐτό (tauto-) 'same', ἴσος (isos-) 'equal' and χρόνος (chronos) 'time') is the curve for which the time taken by an object sliding without friction in uniform gravity to its lowest point is independent of its starting point on the curve. In simpler terms, a rolling or sliding object placed at any point on the curve will reach the bottom at the same time, assuming no friction and identical gravity. The curve is a cycloid, and the time is equal to π times the square root of the radius of the circle which generates the cycloid, divided by the square root of the acceleration of gravity. The tautochrone curve is related to the brachistochrone curve, which is also a cycloid.

== The tautochrone problem ==
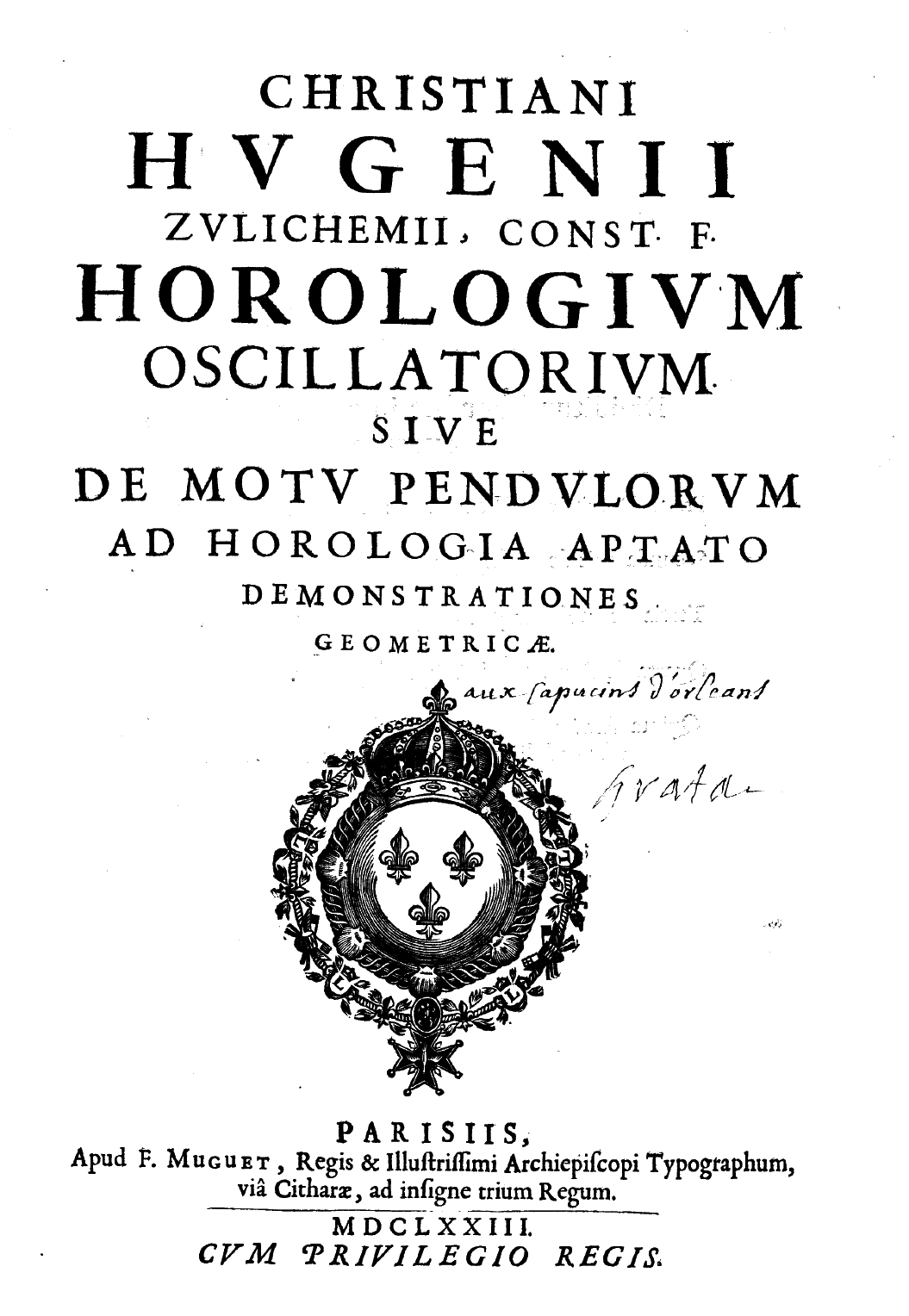
Christiaan Huygens, Horologium oscillatorium sive de motu pendulorum, 1673

The tautochrone problem, the attempt to identify this curve, was solved by Christiaan Huygens in 1659. He proved geometrically in his Horologium Oscillatorium, originally published in 1673, that the curve is a cycloid.

On a cycloid whose axis is erected on the perpendicular and whose vertex is located at the bottom, the times of descent, in which a body arrives at the lowest point at the vertex after having departed from any point on the cycloid, are equal to each other ...

The cycloid is given by a point on a circle of radius $r$ tracing a curve as the circle rolls along the $x$ axis, as:
$$\begin{align}
x &= r(\theta - \sin \theta) \\
y &= r(1 - \cos \theta)
\end{align}$$

Note that a tautochrone as typically drawn, where objects slide downwards towards the origin, is instead traced by the cycloid of a circle rolling upside-down along the line $y = 2r$, such that:
$$\begin{align}
x &= r(\theta + \sin \theta) \\
y &= r(1 - \cos \theta)
\end{align}$$

Huygens also proved that the time of descent is equal to the time a body takes to fall vertically the same distance as diameter of the circle that generates the cycloid, multiplied by $\pi / 2$. In modern terms, this means that the time of descent is $\pi \sqrt{r/g}$, where $r$ is the radius of the circle which generates the cycloid, and $g$ is the gravity of Earth, or more accurately, the earth's gravitational acceleration.

Five isochronous cycloidal pendulums with different amplitudes

This solution was later used to solve the problem of the brachistochrone curve. Johann Bernoulli solved the problem in a paper (Acta Eruditorum, 1697).

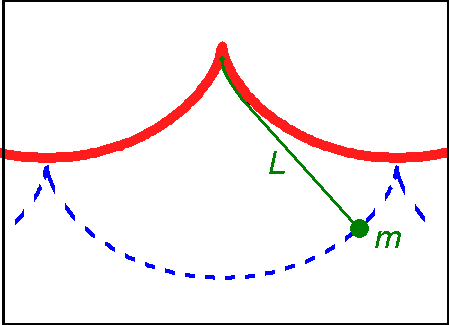
Schematic of a cycloidal pendulum

The tautochrone problem was studied by Huygens more closely when it was realized that a pendulum, which follows a circular path, was not isochronous and thus his pendulum clock would keep different time depending on how far the pendulum swung. After determining the correct path, Christiaan Huygens attempted to create pendulum clocks that used a string to suspend the bob and curb cheeks near the top of the string to change the path to the tautochrone curve. These attempts proved unhelpful for a number of reasons. First, the bending of the string causes friction, changing the timing. Second, there were much more significant sources of timing errors that overwhelmed any theoretical improvements that traveling on the tautochrone curve helps. Finally, the "circular error" of a pendulum decreases as length of the swing decreases, so better clock escapements could greatly reduce this source of inaccuracy.

Later, the mathematicians Joseph Louis Lagrange and Leonhard Euler provided an analytical solution to the problem.

== Lagrangian solution ==
For a simple harmonic oscillator released from rest, regardless of its initial displacement, the time it takes to reach the lowest potential energy point is always a quarter of its period, which is independent of its amplitude. Therefore, the Lagrangian of a simple harmonic oscillator is isochronous.

In the tautochrone problem, if the particle's position is parametrized by the arclength s(t) from the lowest point, the kinetic energy is then proportional to $\dot{s}^2$, and the potential energy is proportional to the height h(s). One way the curve in the tautochrone problem can be an isochrone is if the Lagrangian is mathematically equivalent to a simple harmonic oscillator; that is, the height of the curve must be proportional to the arclength squared:

$h(s) = s^2/(8r),$

where the constant of proportionality is $1/(8r)$. Compared to the simple harmonic oscillator's Lagrangian, the equivalent spring constant is $k=mg/(4r)$, and the time of descent is $T/4=\frac{\pi}{2} \sqrt{\frac{m}{k}}=\pi \sqrt{\frac{r}{g}}.$ However, the physical meaning of the constant $r$ is not clear until we determine the exact analytical equation of the curve.

To solve for the analytical equation of the curve, note that the differential form of the above relation is

$$\begin{align}
dh &= s \,ds/(4r), \\
dh^2 &= s^2 \,ds^2/(16r^2) = h \left(dx^2 + dh^2\right)/(2r),\\
\left(\frac{dx}{dh}\right)^2&=\frac{2r}{h}-1
\end{align}$$

which eliminates s, and leaves a differential equation for dx and dh. This is the differential equation for a cycloid when the vertical coordinate h is counted from its vertex (the point with a horizontal tangent) instead of the cusp.

To find the solution, integrate for x in terms of h:

$$\begin{align}
\frac{dx}{dh} &= -\frac{\sqrt{2r-h}}{\sqrt{h}}, \\
x &= -4r\int \sqrt{1-u^2} \, du,
\end{align}$$

where $u = \sqrt{h/(2r)}$, and the height decreases as the particle moves forward $dx/dh<0$. This integral is the area under a circle, which can be done with another substitution $u=\cos (t/2)$ and yield:

$$\begin{align}
x &=r(t - \sin t), \\
h &=r(1 + \cos t).
\end{align}$$

This is the standard parameterization of a cycloid with $h=2r-y$. It's interesting to note that the arc length squared is equal to the height difference multiplied by the full arch length $8r$.

== "Virtual gravity" solution ==
The simplest solution to the tautochrone problem is to note a direct relation between the angle of an incline and the gravity felt by a particle on the incline. A particle on a 90° vertical incline undergoes full gravitational acceleration $g$, while a particle on a horizontal plane undergoes zero gravitational acceleration. At intermediate angles, the acceleration due to "virtual gravity" by the particle is $g\sin\theta$. Note that $\theta$ is measured between the tangent to the curve and the horizontal, with angles above the horizontal being treated as positive angles. Thus, $\theta$ varies from $-\pi/2$ to $\pi/2$.

The position of a mass measured along a tautochrone curve, $s(t)$, must obey the following differential equation:

$\frac{d^2s}{{dt}^2} = - \omega^2s$

which, along with the initial conditions $s(0)=s_0$ and $s'(0)=0$, has solution:

$s(t) = s_0 \cos \omega t$

It can be easily verified both that this solution solves the differential equation and that a particle will reach $s=0$ at time $\pi/2\omega$ from any starting position $s_0$. The problem is now to construct a curve that will cause the mass to obey the above motion. Newton's second law shows that the force of gravity and the acceleration of the mass are related by:

$$\begin{align}
-g \sin \theta & = \frac{d^2s}{{dt}^2} \\
& = - \omega^2 s \,
\end{align}$$

The explicit appearance of the distance, $s$, is troublesome, but we can differentiate to obtain a more manageable form:

$$\begin{align}
g \cos \theta \,d\theta &= \omega^2 \,ds \\
\Longrightarrow ds &= \frac{g}{\omega^2} \cos \theta \,d\theta
\end{align}$$

This equation relates the change in the curve's angle to the change in the distance along the curve. We now use trigonometry to relate the angle $\theta$ to the differential lengths $dx$, $dy$ and $ds$:

$$\begin{align}
ds = \frac{dx}{\cos \theta} \\
ds = \frac{dy}{\sin \theta}
\end{align}$$

Replacing $ds$ with $dx$ in the above equation lets us solve for $x$ in terms of $\theta$:

$$\begin{align}
ds & = \frac{g}{\omega^2} \cos \theta \,d\theta \\
\frac{dx}{\cos\theta}  & = \frac{g}{\omega^2} \cos \theta\, d\theta \\
dx & = \frac{g}{\omega^2} \cos^2 \theta \,d\theta  \\
& = \frac{g}{2 \omega^2} \left ( \cos 2 \theta + 1 \right ) d\theta  \\
x & = \frac{g}{4 \omega^2} \left ( \sin 2 \theta + 2 \theta \right )  + C_x
\end{align}$$

Likewise, we can also express $ds$ in terms of $dy$ and solve for $y$ in terms of $\theta$:

$$\begin{align}
ds & = \frac{g}{\omega^2} \cos \theta \,d\theta \\
\frac{dy}{\sin\theta}  & = \frac{g}{\omega^2} \cos \theta\, d\theta \\
dy & = \frac{g}{\omega^2} \sin \theta \cos \theta \,d\theta \\
& = \frac{g}{2\omega^2} \sin 2 \theta \,d\theta  \\
y & = -\frac{g}{4\omega^2} \cos 2 \theta + C_y
\end{align}$$

Substituting $\phi = 2\theta$ and $r = \frac{g}{4\omega^2}\,$, we see that these parametric equations for $x$ and $y$ are those of a point on a circle of radius $r$ rolling along a horizontal line (a cycloid), with the circle center at the coordinates $(C_x + r\phi, C_y)$:

$$\begin{align}
x & = r \left( \sin \phi + \phi \right) + C_x \\
y & = -r \cos \phi + C_y
\end{align}$$

Note that $\phi$ ranges from $-\pi \le \phi \le \pi$. It is typical to set $C_x = 0$ and $C_y = r$ so that the lowest point on the curve coincides with the origin. Therefore:

$$\begin{align}
x & = r \left( \phi + \sin \phi\right)\\
y & = r \left( 1 - \cos \phi\right)\\
\end{align}$$

Solving for $\omega$ and remembering that $T = \frac{\pi}{2\omega}$ is the time required for descent, being a quarter of a whole cycle, we find the descent time in terms of the radius $r$:

$$\begin{align}
r & = \frac{g}{4\omega^2} \\
\omega & = \frac{1}{2} \sqrt{\frac{g}{r}} \\
T & = \pi \sqrt{\frac{r}{g}}\\
\end{align}$$

(Based loosely on Proctor, pp. 135–139)

== Abel's solution ==
Niels Henrik Abel attacked a generalized version of the tautochrone problem (Abel's mechanical problem), namely, given a function $T(y)$ that specifies the total time of descent for a given starting height, find an equation of the curve that yields this result. The tautochrone problem is a special case of Abel's mechanical problem when $T(y)$ is a constant.

Abel's solution begins with the principle of conservation of energy – since the particle is frictionless, and thus loses no energy to heat, its kinetic energy at any point is exactly equal to the difference in gravitational potential energy from its starting point. The kinetic energy is $\frac{1}{2} mv^2$, and since the particle is constrained to move along a curve, its velocity is simply ${d\ell}/{dt}$, where $\ell$ is the distance measured along the curve. Likewise, the gravitational potential energy gained in falling from an initial height $y_0$ to a height $y$ is $mg(y_0 - y)$, thus:

$$\begin{align}
\frac{1}{2} m \left ( \frac{d\ell}{dt} \right ) ^2 & = mg(y_0-y) \\
\frac{d\ell}{dt} & = \pm \sqrt{2g(y_0-y)} \\
dt & = \pm \frac{d\ell}{\sqrt{2g(y_0-y)}} \\
dt & = - \frac{1}{\sqrt{2g(y_0-y)}} \frac{d\ell}{dy} \,dy
\end{align}$$

In the last equation, we have anticipated writing the distance remaining along the curve as a function of height ($\ell(y))$, recognized that the distance remaining must decrease as time increases (thus the minus sign), and used the chain rule in the form $d\ell = \frac{d\ell}{dy} dy$.

Now we integrate from $y = y_0$ to $y = 0$ to get the total time required for the particle to fall:

$T(y_0) = \int_{y=y_0}^{y=0} \, dt = \frac{1}{\sqrt{2g}} \int_0^{y_0} \frac{1}{\sqrt{y_0-y}} \frac{d\ell}{dy} \, dy$

This is called Abel's integral equation and allows us to compute the total time required for a particle to fall along a given curve (for which ${d\ell}/{dy}$ would be easy to calculate). But Abel's mechanical problem requires the converse – given $T(y_0)\,$, we wish to find $f(y) = {d\ell}/{dy}$, from which an equation for the curve would follow in a straightforward manner. To proceed, we note that the integral on the right is the convolution of ${d\ell}/{dy}$ with ${1}/{\sqrt{y}}$ and thus take the Laplace transform of both sides with respect to variable $y$:

$\mathcal{L}[T(y_0)] = \frac{1}{\sqrt{2g}} \mathcal{L} \left [ \frac{1}{\sqrt{y}} \right ]F(s)$

where $F(s) = \mathcal{L} {\left[ {d\ell}/{dy} \right ]}$. Since $\mathcal{L} {\left[ {1}/{\sqrt{y}} \right]} = \sqrt{{\pi}/{s}}$, we now have an expression for the Laplace transform of ${d\ell}/{dy}$ in terms of the Laplace transform of $T(y_0)$:

$\mathcal{L}\left [ \frac{d\ell}{dy} \right ] = \sqrt{\frac{2g}{\pi}} s^{\frac{1}{2}} \mathcal{L}[T(y_0)]$

This is as far as we can go without specifying $T(y_0)$. Once $T(y_0)$ is known, we can compute its Laplace transform, calculate the Laplace transform of ${d\ell}/{dy}$ and then take the inverse transform (or try to) to find ${d\ell}/{dy}$.

For the tautochrone problem, $T(y_0) = T_0\,$ is constant. Since the Laplace transform of 1 is ${1}/{s}$, i.e., $\mathcal{L}[T(y_0)] = {T_0}/{s}$, we find the shape function $f(y) = {d\ell}/{dy}$:

$$\begin{align}
F(s) = \mathcal{L} {\left [ \frac{d\ell}{dy} \right ]}
& = \sqrt{\frac{2g}{\pi}} s^{\frac{1}{2}} \mathcal{L}[T_0] \\
& = \sqrt{\frac{2g}{\pi}} T_0 s^{-\frac{1}{2}}
\end{align}$$

Making use again of the Laplace transform above, we invert the transform and conclude:

$\frac{d\ell}{dy} = T_0 \frac{\sqrt{2g}}{\pi}\frac{1}{\sqrt{y}}$

(Simmons, Section 54).

Using the fact that $\left(\frac{d\ell}{dy}\right)^2 = \left(\frac{dx}{dy}\right)^2 + 1$, we can rewrite the above as:

$\left(\frac{dx}{dy}\right)^2 + 1 = T_0^2\frac{2g}{\pi^2}\frac{1}{y}$

Let:

$r = \frac{T_0^2g}{\pi^2}$

So that:

$$\begin{align}
\left(\frac{dx}{dy}\right)^2 + 1 & = \frac{2r}{y} \\
\left(\frac{dx}{dy}\right)^2 & = \frac{2r - y}{y} \\
dx & = \sqrt{\frac{2r - y}{y}} \,dy
\end{align}$$

In order to integrate, substitute:

$$\begin{align}
y & = 2r \sin^2 \frac{\theta}{2} \\
dy &= 2r \sin \frac{\theta}{2} \cos \frac{\theta}{2} \,d \theta
\end{align}$$

We can now rewrite the equation for $dx$ as:

$$\begin{align}
dx & = \sqrt{\frac{2r - 2r \sin^2 \frac{\theta}{2}}{2r \sin^2 \frac{\theta}{2}}} 2r \sin \frac{\theta}{2} \cos \frac{\theta}{2} \,d \theta \\
& = 2r \sqrt{\frac{1 - \sin^2 \frac{\theta}{2}}{\sin^2 \frac{\theta}{2}}} \sin \frac{\theta}{2} \cos \frac{\theta}{2} \,d \theta \\
& = 2r \sqrt{\frac{\cos^2 \frac{\theta}{2}}{\sin^2 \frac{\theta}{2}}} \sin \frac{\theta}{2} \cos \frac{\theta}{2} \,d \theta \\
& = 2r \cos^2 \frac{\theta}{2} \,d \theta \\
& = r(\cos \theta + 1) \,d \theta
\end{align}$$

Integrating both sides arrives at:

$x = r(\theta + \sin \theta)$

And as we parameterized $y$ as:

$$\begin{align}
y & = 2r \sin^2 \frac{\theta}{2} \\
& = r(1 - \cos \theta)
\end{align}$$

we now have equations for both $x$ and $y$ parameterized by $\theta$:

$$\begin{align}
x & = r(\theta + \sin \theta) \\
y & = r(1 - \cos \theta)
\end{align}$$

which trace a tautochrone sitting on top of the $x$ axis.

(Based on O'neil, pp. 263-264)

== Photonic analogues ==
The tautochrone principle has also been extended to light. In 2026, researchers proposed a photonic tautochrone, an optical system in which light waves starting from different positions can be made to converge at the exact same point simultaneously, regardless of their initial position. Unlike the classical tautochrone, which relies on the shape of the cycloidal curve, the optical version achieves this effect by controlling how light propagates through a medium. This simultaneous focusing can increase the local intensity of light and enhance nonlinear optical effects.

== See also ==
- Beltrami identity
- Brachistochrone curve
- Calculus of variations
- Catenary
- Cycloid
- Uniformly accelerated motion

== Bibliography ==
- Simmons, George (1972). Differential Equations with Applications and Historical Notes. McGraw–Hill. ISBN 0-07-057540-1.
- Proctor, Richard Anthony (1878). A Treatise on the Cycloid and All Forms of Cycloidal Curves, and on the Use of Such Curves in Dealing with the Motions of Planets, Comets, etc., and of Matter Projected from the Sun.
- O'Neil, Peter V. (1983). Advanced engineering mathematics. Belmont, Calif: Wadsworth Pub. Co. pp. 263–264. ISBN 0-534-01136-5.
