= Paul du Bois-Reymond =

German mathematician (1831–1889)

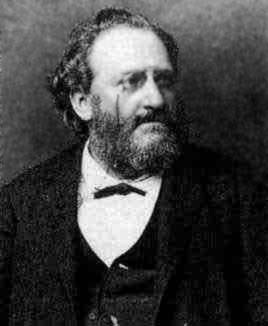
Paul David Gustav du Bois-Reymond.

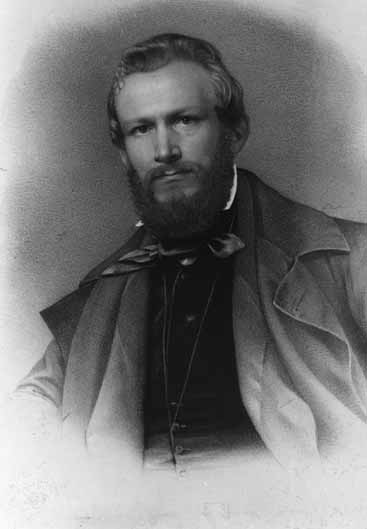
Paul David Gustav du Bois-Reymond.

Paul David Gustav du Bois-Reymond (2 December 1831 – 7 April 1889) was a German mathematician who was born in Berlin and died in Freiburg. He was the brother of Emil du Bois-Reymond.

His thesis was concerned with the mechanical equilibrium of fluids. He worked on the theory of functions and in mathematical physics. His interests included Sturm–Liouville theory, integral equations, variational calculus, and Fourier series. In this latter field, he was able in 1873 to construct a continuous function whose Fourier series is not convergent. His lemma defines a sufficient condition to guarantee that a function vanishes almost everywhere.

In a paper of 1875, du Bois-Reymond employed for the first time the method of diagonalization, later associated with the name of Cantor. Du Bois-Reymond also established that a trigonometric series that converges to a continuous function at every point is the Fourier series of this function. He is also associated with the fundamental lemma of calculus of variations of which he proved a refined version based on that of Lagrange.

== Theory of infinitesimals ==
Paul du Bois-Reymond developed a theory of infinitesimals:

The infinitely small is a mathematical quantity and has all its properties in common with the finite […] A belief in the infinitely small does not triumph easily. Yet when one thinks boldly and freely, the initial distrust will soon mellow into a pleasant certainty ... A majority of educated people will admit an infinite in space and time, and not just an "unboundedly large". But they will only with difficulty believe in the infinitely small, despite the fact that the infinitely small has the same right to existence as the infinitely large. […]

— Paul du Bois-Reymond, Über die Paradoxen des Infinitär-Calcüls (On the paradoxes of the infinitary calculus), 1877

== Writings ==
- Théorie générale des fonctions (Nice : Impr. niçoise, 1887) (translated in French from the original German by G. Millaud and A. Girot)
- De Aequilibrio Fluidorum (PhD Thesis, 1859)
