= Cycloid =

Curve traced by a point on a rolling circle

A cycloid generated by a rolling circle

In geometry, a cycloid is the curve traced by a point on a circle as it rolls along a straight line without slipping. A cycloid is a specific form of trochoid and is an example of a roulette, a curve generated by a curve rolling on another curve.

The cycloid, with the cusps pointing upward, is the curve of fastest descent under uniform gravity (the brachistochrone curve). It is also the form of a curve for which the period of an object in simple harmonic motion (rolling up and down repetitively) along the curve does not depend on the object's starting position (the tautochrone curve). In physics, when a charged particle at rest is put under uniform electric and magnetic fields perpendicular to one another, the particle’s trajectory draws out a cycloid.

Balls rolling under uniform gravity without friction on a cycloid (black) and straight lines with various gradients. It demonstrates that the ball on the curve always beats the balls travelling in a straight line path to the intersection point of the curve and each straight line.

== History ==
It was in the left hand try-pot of the Pequod, with the soapstone diligently circling round me, that I was first indirectly struck by the remarkable fact, that in geometry all bodies gliding along the cycloid, my soapstone for example, will descend from any point in precisely the same time.

— Moby Dick by Herman Melville, 1851

The cycloid has been called "The Helen of Geometers" as, like Helen of Troy, it caused frequent quarrels among 17th-century mathematicians, while Sarah Hart sees it named as such "because the properties of this curve are so beautiful".

Historians of mathematics have proposed several candidates for the discoverer of the cycloid. Mathematical historian Paul Tannery speculated that such a simple curve must have been known to the ancients, citing similar work by Carpus of Antioch described by Iamblichus. English mathematician John Wallis writing in 1679 attributed the discovery to Nicholas of Cusa, but subsequent scholarship indicates that either Wallis was mistaken or the evidence he used is now lost. Galileo Galilei's name was put forward at the end of the 19th century and at least one author reports credit being given to Marin Mersenne. Beginning with the work of Moritz Cantor and Siegmund Günther, scholars now assign priority to French mathematician Charles de Bovelles based on his description of the cycloid in his Introductio in geometriam, published in 1503. In this work, Bovelles mistakes the arch traced by a rolling wheel as part of a larger circle with a radius 125% larger than the smaller wheel.

Galileo originated the term cycloid and was the first to make a serious study of the curve. According to his student Evangelista Torricelli, in 1599 Galileo attempted the quadrature of the cycloid (determining the area under the cycloid) with an unusually empirical approach that involved tracing both the generating circle and the resulting cycloid on sheet metal, cutting them out and weighing them. He discovered the ratio was roughly 3:1, which is the true value, but he incorrectly concluded that the ratio was irrational, which would have made quadrature impossible. Around 1628, Gilles Persone de Roberval likely learned of the quadrature problem from Père Marin Mersenne and effected the quadrature in 1634 by using Cavalieri's Theorem. However, this work was not published until 1693 (in his Traité des Indivisibles).

Constructing the tangent of the cycloid dates to August 1638 when Mersenne received unique methods from Roberval, Pierre de Fermat and René Descartes. Mersenne passed these results along to Galileo, who gave them to his students Torricelli and Viviani, who were able to produce a quadrature. This result and others were published by Torricelli in 1644, which is also the first printed work on the cycloid. This led to Roberval charging Torricelli with plagiarism, with the controversy cut short by Torricelli's early death in 1647.

In 1658, Blaise Pascal had given up mathematics for theology but, while suffering from a toothache, began considering several problems concerning the cycloid. His toothache disappeared, and he took this as a heavenly sign to proceed with his research. Eight days later he had completed his essay and, to publicize the results, proposed a contest. Pascal proposed three questions relating to the center of gravity, area and volume of the cycloid, with the winner or winners to receive prizes of 20 and 40 Spanish doubloons. Pascal, Roberval and Senator Carcavy were the judges, and neither of the two submissions (by John Wallis and Antoine de Lalouvère) was judged to be adequate. While the contest was ongoing, Christopher Wren sent Pascal a proposal for a proof of the rectification of the cycloid; Roberval claimed promptly that he had known of the proof for years. Wallis published Wren's proof (crediting Wren) in Wallis's Tractatus Duo, giving Wren priority for the first published proof.

Fifteen years later, Christiaan Huygens had deployed the cycloidal pendulum to improve chronometers and had discovered that a particle would traverse a segment of an inverted cycloidal arch in the same amount of time, regardless of its starting point. In 1686, Gottfried Wilhelm Leibniz used analytic geometry to describe the curve with a single equation. In 1696, Johann Bernoulli posed the brachistochrone problem, the solution of which is a cycloid.

== Equations ==
The cycloid through the origin, generated by a circle of radius r, in the upper half-plane, rolling over the x-axis, consists of the points (x, y), with
$$\begin{align}
x &= r(t - \sin t) \\
y &= r(1 - \cos t),
\end{align}$$
where t is a real parameter corresponding to the angle through which the rolling circle has rotated. For given t, the circle's centre lies at (x, y) = (rt, r).

The Cartesian equation is obtained by solving the y-equation for t and substituting into the x-equation:
$$x = r \cos^{-1} \left(1 - \frac{y}{r}\right) - \sqrt{y(2r - y)},$$
or, eliminating the multiple-valued inverse cosine:

$r \cos\!\left(\frac{x+\sqrt{y(2r-y)}}{r}\right) + y = r.$

When y is viewed as a function of x, the cycloid is differentiable everywhere except at the cusps on the x-axis, with the derivative tending toward $\infty$ or $-\infty$ near a cusp (where y=0). The map from t to (x, y) is differentiable, in fact of class C^{∞}, with derivative (0,0) at the cusps.

The slope of the tangent to the cycloid at the point $(x,y)$ is given by $\frac{dy}{dx} = \cot(\frac{t}{2})$.

A cycloid segment from one cusp to the next is called an arch of the cycloid, for example the points with $0 \le t \le 2 \pi$ and $0 \leq x \leq 2\pi$.

Considering the cycloid as the graph of a function $y = f(x)$, it satisfies the differential equation:

$$\left(\frac{dy}{dx}\right)^2 = \frac{2r}{y} - 1.$$

If we define $h=2r-y= r(1 + \cos t)$ as the height difference from the cycloid's vertex (the point with a horizontal tangent and $\cos t=-1$), then we have:

$$\left(\frac{dx}{dh }\right)^2 = \frac{2r}{h} - 1.$$

== Involute ==
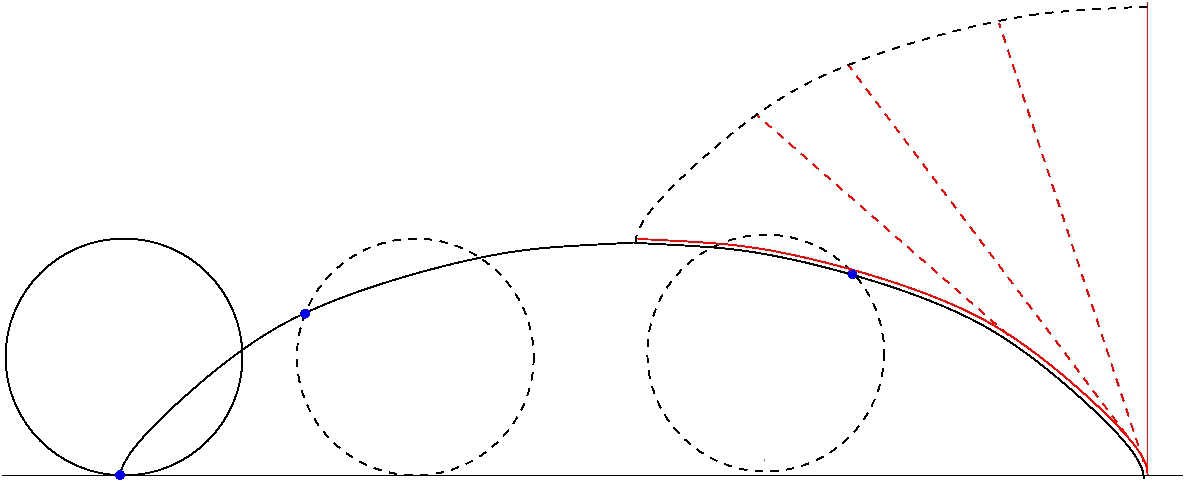
Generation of the involute of the cycloid unwrapping a tense wire placed on half cycloid arc (red marked)

The involute of the cycloid has exactly the same shape as the cycloid it originates from. This can be visualized as the path traced by the tip of a wire initially lying on a half arch of the cycloid: as it unrolls while remaining tangent to the original cycloid, it describes a new cycloid (see also cycloidal pendulum and arc length).

=== Demonstration ===
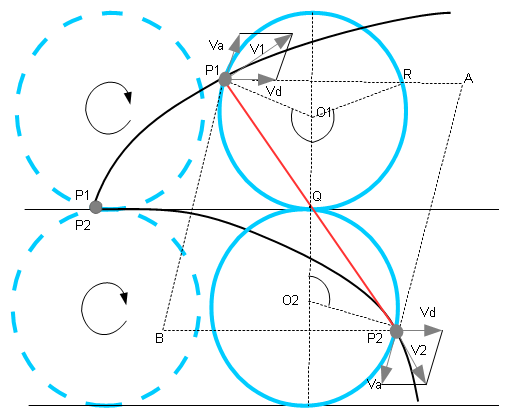
Demonstration of the properties of the involute of a cycloid

This demonstration uses the rolling-wheel definition of cycloid, as well as the instantaneous velocity vector of a moving point, tangent to its trajectory. In the adjacent picture, $P_1$ and $P_2$ are two points belonging to two rolling circles, with the base of the first just above the top of the second. Initially, $P_1$ and $P_2$ coincide at the intersection point of the two circles. When the circles roll horizontally with the same speed, $P_1$ and $P_2$ traverse two cycloid curves. Considering the red line connecting $P_1$ and $P_2$ at a given time, one proves the line is always tangent to the lower arc at $P_2$ and orthogonal to the upper arc at $P_1$. Let $Q$ be the point in common between the upper and lower circles at the given time. Then:

- $P_1,Q,P_2$ are colinear: indeed the equal rolling speed gives equal angles $\widehat{P_1O_1Q}=\widehat{P_2O_2Q}$, and thus $\widehat{O_1 Q P_1} = \widehat{O_2QP_2}$ . The point $Q$ lies on the line $O_1O_2$ therefore $\widehat{P_1 Q O_1} + \widehat{P_1QO_2}=\pi$ and analogously $\widehat{P_2QO_2}+\widehat{P_2QO_1}=\pi$. From the equality of $\widehat{O_1QP_1}$ and $\widehat{O_2QP_2}$ one has that also $\widehat{P_1QO_2}=\widehat{P_2QO_1}$. It follows $\widehat{P_1QO_1}+\widehat{P_2QO_1}=\pi$ .
- If $A$ is the meeting point between the perpendicular from $P_1$ to the line segment $O_1O_2$ and the tangent to the circle at $P_2$ , then the triangle $P_1AP_2$ is isosceles, as is easily seen from the construction: $\widehat{QP_2A}=\tfrac{1}{2}\widehat{P_2O_2Q}$ and $\widehat{QP_1A} = \tfrac{1}{2}\widehat{QO_1R}=$$\tfrac{1}{2}\widehat{QO_1P_1}$ . For the previous noted equality between $\widehat{P_1O_1Q}$ and $\widehat{QO_2P_2}$ then $\widehat{QP_1A}=\widehat{QP_2A}$ and $P_1AP_2$ is isosceles.
- Drawing from $P_2$ the orthogonal segment to $O_1O_2$, from $P_1$ the straight line tangent to the upper circle, and calling $B$ the meeting point, one sees that $P_1AP_2B$ is a rhombus using the theorems on angles between parallel lines
- Now consider the velocity $V_2$ of $P_2$ . It can be seen as the sum of two components, the rolling velocity $V_a$ and the drifting velocity $V_d$, which are equal in modulus because the circles roll without skidding. $V_d$ is parallel to $P_1A$, while $V_a$ is tangent to the lower circle at $P_2$ and therefore is parallel to $P_2A$. The rhombus constituted from the components $V_d$ and $V_a$ is therefore similar (same angles) to the rhombus $BP_1AP_2$ because they have parallel sides. Then $V_2$, the total velocity of $P_2$, is parallel to $P_2P_1$ because both are diagonals of two rhombuses with parallel sides and has in common with $P_1P_2$ the contact point $P_2$. Thus the velocity vector $V_2$ lies on the prolongation of $P_1P_2$ . Because $V_2$ is tangent to the cycloid at $P_2$, it follows that also $P_1P_2$ coincides with the tangent to the lower cycloid at $P_2$.
- Analogously, it can be easily demonstrated that $P_1P_2$ is orthogonal to $V_1$ (the other diagonal of the rhombus).
- This proves that the tip of a wire initially stretched on a half arch of the lower cycloid and fixed to the upper circle at $P_1$ will follow the point along its path without changing its length because the speed of the tip is at each moment orthogonal to the wire (no stretching or compression). The wire will be at the same time tangent at $P_2$ to the lower arc because of the tension and the facts demonstrated above. (If it were not tangent there would be a discontinuity at $P_2$ and consequently unbalanced tension forces.)

== Measurement ==
=== Area ===
Using the above parameterization $x = r(t - \sin t)$ and $y = r(1 - \cos t)$, the area under one arch, $0 \leq t \leq 2\pi,$ is given by:
$$A = \int_{x=0}^{2 \pi r} y \, dx
= \int_{t=0}^{2 \pi} r^2(1 - \cos t)^2 dt = 3\pi r^2.$$
This is three times the area of the rolling circle.

=== Arc length ===
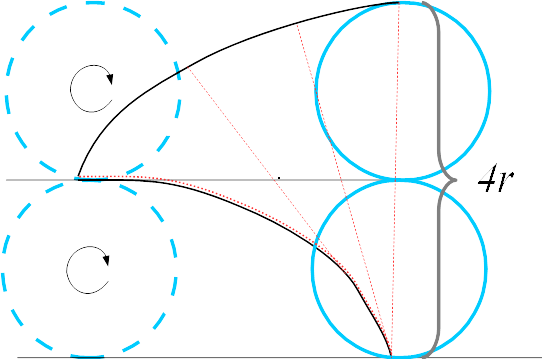
The length of the cycloid as consequence of the property of its involute

The arc length S of one arch is given by
$$\begin{align}
S &= \int_0^{2\pi} \sqrt{\left(\frac{dx}{dt}\right)^2 + \left(\frac{dy}{dt}\right)^2} dt \\
&= \int_0^{2\pi} r \sqrt{2 - 2\cos t}\, dt \\
&= 2r\int_0^{2\pi} \sin \frac{t}{2}\, dt \\
&= 8r.
\end{align}$$

Another geometric way to calculate the length of the cycloid is to notice that when a wire describing an involute has been completely unwrapped from half an arch, it extends itself along two diameters, a length of 4r. This is thus equal to half the length of arch, and that of a complete arch is 8r.

From the cycloid's vertex (the point with a horizontal tangent and $\cos t=-1$) to any point within the same arch, the arc length squared is $8r^2(1+\cos t)$, which is proportional to the height difference $r(1+\cos t)$; this property is the basis for the cycloid's isochronism. In fact, the arc length squared is equal to the height difference multiplied by the full arch length 8r.

== Cycloidal pendulum ==
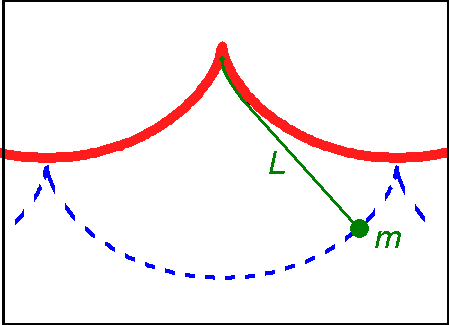
Schematic of a cycloidal pendulum.

If a simple pendulum is suspended from the cusp of an inverted cycloid, such that the string is constrained to be tangent to one of its arches, and the pendulum's length L is equal to that of half the arc length of the cycloid (i.e., twice the diameter of the generating circle, L = 4r), the bob of the pendulum also traces a cycloid path. Such a pendulum is isochronous, with equal-time swings regardless of amplitude. Introducing a coordinate system centred in the position of the cusp, the equation of motion is given by:
$$\begin{align}
x &= r[2\theta(t) + \sin 2\theta (t)] \\
y &= r[-3-\cos2\theta (t)],
\end{align}$$
where $\theta$ is the angle that the straight part of the string makes with the vertical axis, and is given by
$$\sin\theta (t) = A \cos(\omega t),\omega^2 = \frac{g}{L}=\frac{g}{4r},$$
where A < 1 is the "amplitude", $\omega$ is the radian frequency of the pendulum and g the gravitational acceleration.

Five isochronous cycloidal pendula with different amplitudes.

The 17th-century Dutch mathematician Christiaan Huygens discovered and proved these properties of the cycloid while searching for more accurate pendulum clock designs to be used in navigation.

== Related curves ==
Several curves are related to the cycloid.

- Trochoid: generalization of a cycloid in which the point tracing the curve may be inside the rolling circle (curtate) or outside (prolate).
- Hypocycloid: variant of a cycloid in which a circle rolls on the inside of another circle instead of a line.
- Epicycloid: variant of a cycloid in which a circle rolls on the outside of another circle instead of a line.
- Hypotrochoid: generalization of a hypocycloid where the generating point may not be on the edge of the rolling circle.
- Epitrochoid: generalization of an epicycloid where the generating point may not be on the edge of the rolling circle.

All these curves are roulettes with a circle rolled along another curve of uniform curvature. The cycloid, epicycloids, and hypocycloids have the property that each is similar to its evolute. If q is the product of that curvature with the circle's radius, signed positive for epi- and negative for hypo-, then the similitude ratio of curve to evolute is 1 + 2q.

The classic Spirograph toy traces out hypotrochoid and epitrochoid curves.

== Other uses ==
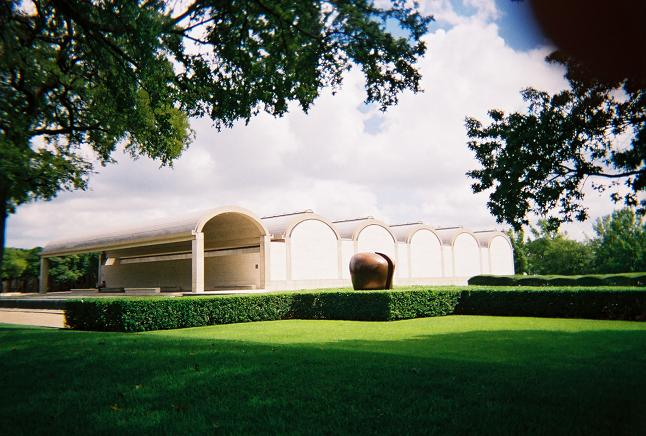
Cycloidal arches at the Kimbell Art Museum

The cycloidal arch was used by architect Louis Kahn in his design for the Kimbell Art Museum in Fort Worth, Texas. It was also used by Wallace K. Harrison in the design of the Hopkins Center at Dartmouth College in Hanover, New Hampshire.

Early research indicated that some transverse arching curves of the plates of golden age violins are closely modeled by curtate cycloid curves. Later work indicates that curtate cycloids do not serve as general models for these curves, which vary considerably.

== See also ==
- Cyclogon
- Cycloid gear
- List of periodic functions
- Tautochrone curve
- Trochoid (for points located outside the circle)
- Cycloidal marks
