= Homage to Paderewski =

Album of piano pieces by multiple composers

Homage to Paderewski is an album of piano pieces by 17 composers, published in 1942 in honour of the Polish pianist, composer and statesman Ignacy Jan Paderewski.

== Background ==
Homage to Paderewski was commissioned by the music publisher Boosey & Hawkes in 1941 in celebration of the 50th anniversary of Paderewski's American debut in 1891. It was Zygmunt Stojowski who initiated the venture. He encouraged some composer friends of Paderewski's to write miniatures for the anniversary. However, Paderewski died on 29 June 1941, before the project was completed, and so the album, on its publication in 1942, became a posthumous tribute to his life and work.

Twenty-one composers submitted 22 works, and 17 were chosen for publication. Of these 17 composers, only three were native-born Americans. The remainder had either settled in North America or were working there temporarily (Benjamin Britten and Eugene Goossens were in the United States; Arthur Benjamin was in Canada).

Britten misunderstood the commission and wrote a piece for two pianos. It was published separately but is still considered a part of the overall homage. Béla Bartók did not write a new piece but provided a short suite of three pieces written in 1914–18. Jaromír Weinberger's contribution also seems to have been composed earlier, in 1924. Ernest Schelling, a student of Paderewski, had died in 1939, but his widow submitted a late untitled composition, in the belief that he would have wanted to be involved.

The pieces are all short, none taking more than four minutes to play and some just over one minute.

The premiere recording of the complete work was made in 2011 by Jonathan Plowright, with Aaron Shorr in the Britten piece.

== The music ==
Composer	Nationality	Dates	Title	Notes
Béla Bartók	Hungarian	1881 – 1945	Three Hungarian Folk-Tunes, Sz.66	(1. Andante tranquillo, rubato; 2. Allegro non troppo, un poco rubato; 3. Maestoso.) Bartók was living in the US and hoped to return to his native Hungary at war's end, but died in New York City. These pieces dating from 1914 to 1918 take about a minute each and contain typically Hungarian characteristics such as modal melodies based on the Mixolydian and Dorian scales; and frequent melodic leaps of the fourth. It is hard to see how Bartók felt them to be relevant to the life and work of a Polish statesman and patriot.
Arthur Benjamin	Australian	1893 – 1960	Elegiac Mazurka	Benjamin had long been based in London but was currently working in Vancouver, British Columbia, Canada, where he was the conductor of the Canadian Broadcasting Corporation Symphony Orchestra. The mazurka is a traditional Polish dance.
Benjamin Britten	British	1913 – 1976	Mazurka elegiaca, Op. 23/2, for 2 pianos	Britten misunderstood the commission and composed a work for two pianos. It was published separately. It was the second of two pieces within his Op. 23, the first being Introduction and Rondo alla burlesca (1940).
Mario Castelnuovo-Tedesco	Italian	1895 – 1968	Hommage à Paderewski	Castelnuovo-Tedesco settled in California and became known as a film composer. Hommage à Paderewski is in the style of a mazurka.
Theodore Chanler	American	1902 – 1961	Aftermath	
Eugene Goossens	British	1892 – 1962	Homage	Goossens was working as conductor of the Cincinnati Symphony Orchestra. Homage is based on Frédéric Chopin’s Prelude No. 20 in C minor (the "Chord Prelude")
Richard Hammond	British	1896 – 1980	Dance	Hammond moved to the US during World War I, settling in Los Angeles. Dance is a rhythmic and exuberant work in mixed metres.
Felix Labunski	Polish	1892 – 1979	Threnody	Labunski migrated to America in 1936 and settled in Cincinnati. In 1928 Paderewski had funded the remainder of his studies in Paris with Paul Dukas and Nadia Boulanger. Labunski also dedicated a symphonic poem In memoriam to Paderewski.
Bohuslav Martinů	Czech	1890 – 1959	Mazurka, H. 284	Martinů arrived in America in 1941 and settled in New York, but returned to Europe in 1956. The Mazurka is in ABA form with the outer sections marked Moderato poco andante and the middle section marked Poco vivo.
Darius Milhaud	French	1892 – 1974	Choral	Milhaud moved to the United States in 1940. Choral is in 5/4 time and the two hands play in different keys.
Joaquín Nin-Culmell	Cuban	1908 – 2004	In memoriam Paderewski	Nin-Culmell was born in Berlin of Cuban ancestry and moved to the United States in 1939. In Memoriam Paderewski is a mazurka, albeit with a Latin American flavour achieved through the use of syncopation in the latter half – the right hand plays in 3/4 while the left hand plays in 6/8.
Karol Rathaus	German	1895 – 1954	Kujawiak	Rathaus was born in an area of the Austro-Hungarian Empire now in Ukraine. He trained in Berlin and Vienna, relocating to New York in 1938. The Kujawiak is a Polish dance in triple metre.
Vittorio Rieti	Italian	1898 – 1994	Allegro danzante	Rieti migrated to the United States in 1940 and settled in New York. The two-handed octaves in his piece evoke the spirit of Paderewski's own Caprice from his Humoresques de concert, Op 14.
Ernest Schelling	American	1876 – 1939	Con tenerezza	Schelling was a student of Paderewski, who was greatly affected by his death in 1939. Schelling's widow submitted her husband's last composition, knowing that he would have wanted to share in any tribute to his mentor. In 1926 Schelling had written a nocturne titled Ragusa, dedicated "To my master, I. J. Paderewski". The dedicatee later recorded the piece himself.
Zygmunt Stojowski	Polish	1870 – 1946	Cradle Song	Stojowski also studied with Paderewski. He moved to New York in 1905 to be on the founding faculty of the Institute of Musical Art. Cradle Song is a Spanish-American berceuse based on the lullaby Alarroro rito, which Stojowski learned from his Peruvian wife Luisa, whom he had met through Paderewski.
Jaromír Weinberger	Czech	1896 – 1967	Étude in G major	Weinberger migrated to America in 1939. His Étude in G major, written in 1924, is based on Z dymem pozarów (From the smoke of fires), a 19th-century Polish patriotic hymn. The same melody was used by Sir Edward Elgar in his symphonic prelude Polonia, dedicated to Paderewski during World War I.
Emerson Whithorne	American	1884 – 1958	Hommage, Op. 58/2	Whithorne studied piano in Europe with Paderewski's teacher Theodor Leschetizky. Most of Hommage is written on four staves, and marked Lento.

== Sources ==
- Hyperion Records
- Music Web International: Recording of the Month
- Homage to Paderewski at Boosey & Hawkes
