= Raritäten der Klaviermusik =

Annual piano music festival in Husum, Germany

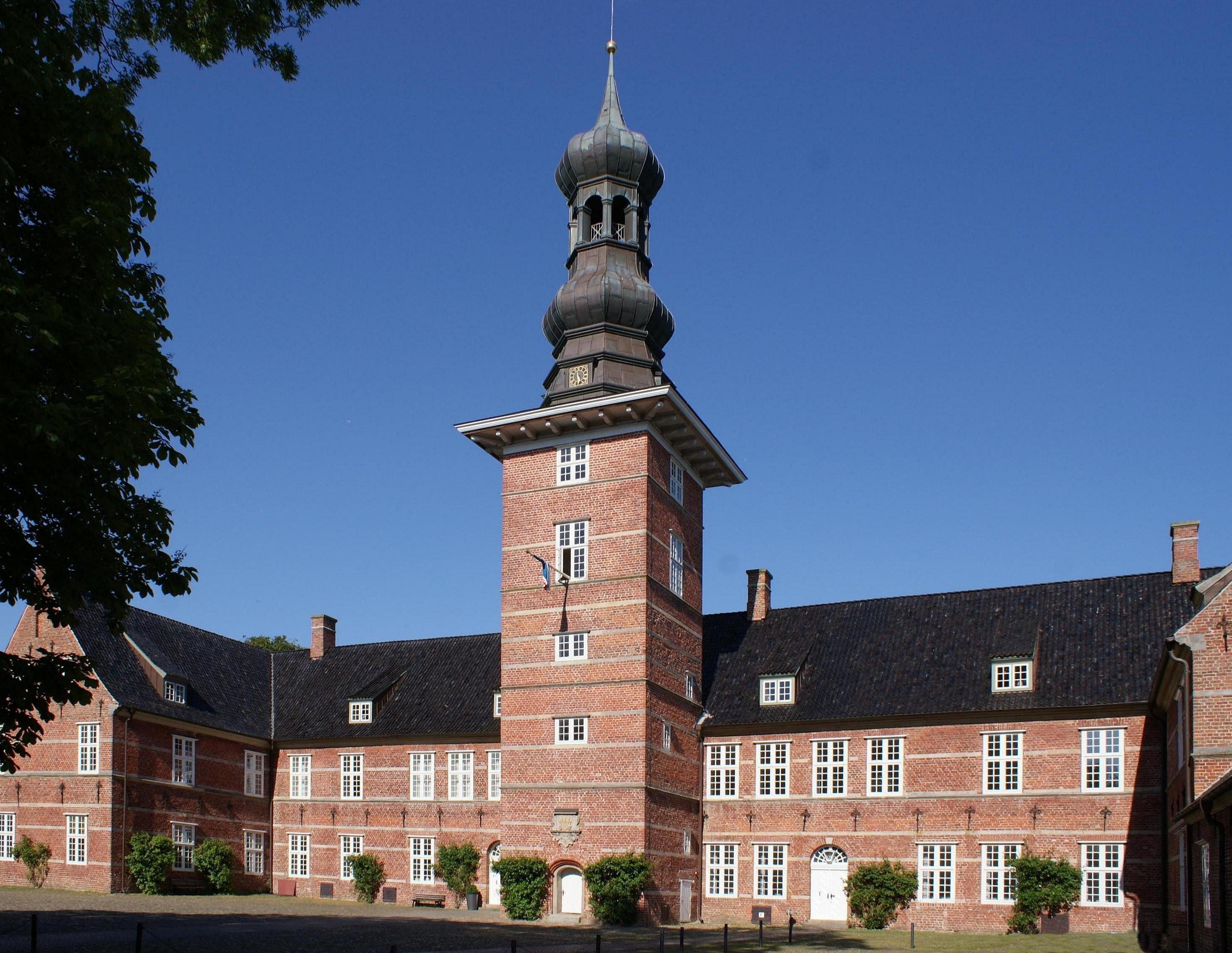
- Schloss vor Husum, the concert venue
- Genre: Rare piano music
- Begins: August
- Frequency: annual
- Locations: Husum, Schleswig-Holstein, Germany
- Inaugurated: 1987; 39 years ago
- People: Peter Froundjian
- Website: piano-festival-husum.com

Raritäten der Klaviermusik (Rarities of piano music) is an annual festival of classical piano music in the Schloss vor Husum, Schleswig-Holstein, Germany. It was founded in 1987 by Peter Froundjian who has directed it since. More than 2000 rarely played piano pieces have been performed by more than 150 pianists.

== Festival ==
The annual festival of classical piano music was founded in 1987 by Peter Froundjian who has directed it since. The venue of the annual festival of rarely played classical piano music is the knights' hall of the Schloss vor Husum, seating around 160 people. The festival is run by the Nordfriesland district and the Stiftung Nordfriesland.

Each festival, in August, features ten evening concerts, a matinee and an exhibition in the foyer of the palace. More than 150 pianists have played programs of rarely played music, and meet an international audience open to discoveries. The music is supported by a detailed program book with background information for the pieces and their players.

Some concerts have been recorded by the Danish label Danacord. The production of a CD of live music resulted in a wider distribution. In 2011 a book about the festival was published, Jenseits des Mainstreams, with an English version Beyond the Mainstream. Kreis Nordfriesland and die Stiftung Nordfriesland. The broadcaster NDR is a cultural partner of the festival.

Pianists who have played at the festival, several more than once, have included (as of 2012):

=== A ===
- Donna Amato (1991)
- Piotr Anderszewski (2000)
- Ludmil Angelov (2005)
- Koji Attwood (2008)

=== B ===
- Serge Babayan (1992)
- Andrea Bacchetti (2003 and 2005)
- Andreas Bach (1999)
- Paul Badura-Skoda (1994)
- Werner Bärtschi (1993)
- Mark Bebbington (2007)
- Markus Becker (2005)
- Jozef De Beenhouwer (1989)
- Giovanni Bellucci (2001 and 2010)
- Daniel Berman (1987 to 1989, 1992, 2008 and 2011)
- İdil Biret (1989)
- Boris Bloch (1987, 1989, 1991, 1998 and 2004)

=== C ===
- Sylvie Carbonel (1994)
- Roberto Cappello (1993, 1995 and 1997)
- Frederic Chiu (1997 and 1999)
- Roberto Cominati (2000)

=== D ===
- Michal Dalberto (1998)

=== E ===
- Ekaterina Derzhavina (2005 and 2007)
- Danny Driver (2011)
- Jean Dubé (2002)
- Duo of Andreas Grau and Götz Schumacher (2012)
- Duo Tal & Groethuysen (2000, 2002 and 2006)
- Duo Quatre mains, Peter Rummenhöller and Manfred Theilen (1987)
- Michael Endres (2005)

=== F ===
- Janina Fialkowska (1998)
- Sergio Fiorentino (1993)
- Bengt Forsberg (1990)
- Philip Fowke (1988 and 1995)
- Peter Froundjian (1987 to 1989, 1996, 2003 and 2008)

=== G ===
- Kemal Gekić (2011)
- Håvard Gimse (2011)
- Marie-Cathérine Girod (1992, 1995, 1997, 2000 and 2003)
- Carlo Grante (1996)
- Sofja Gülbadamova (2012)
- Enrique Perez de Guzman (1993 and 1994)

=== H ===
- Marc-André Hamelin (1988 to 1990, 1992, 1994, 1996, 1998, 2000, 2002, 2004, 2006, 2008, 2010 and 2011)
- Wolf Harden (2012)
- Alex Hassan (2007)
- Endre Hegedűs (1995)
- Peter-Jürgen Hofer (1992)
- Stephen Hough (1992 and 1994)
- Leslie Howard (1998)

=== J ===
- Peter Jablonski (2008)

=== K ===
- Igor Kamenz (2004)
- Cyprien Katsaris (2003 and 2006)
- Nina Kavtaradze (1993)
- Rainer M. Klaas (1987 to 1989)
- Benedikt Koehlen (1990)
- Anton Kuerti (1995 and 1997)
- Elena Kuschnerova (2003 and 2004)

=== L ===
- Piers Lane (1996, 1998, 2007 and 2011)
- Kolja Lessing (1991, 1992, 2002 and 2007)
- Francesco Libetta (2000)
- Cecile Licad (2005 and 2006)
- Michail Lifits (2010)
- Konstantin Lifschitz (2002 and 2005)
- Jenny Lin (2010)
- Alexej Ljubimow (1991 and 1999)
- Jean-Marc Luisada (1989)
- Gianluca Luisi (2012)

=== M ===
- Geoffrey Douglas Madge (1990)
- Oleg Marshev (1994 and 1998)
- Yuri Martinow (1997)
- Voytek Matushevski (1991)
- Frédéric Meinders (1999, 2001 and 2006)
- Hamish Milne (1989, 1991, 1994, 1996, 2000 and 2006)
- Gabriela Montero (2006)
- Joseph Moog (2012)

=== N ===
- Eldar Nebolsin (2006 and 2010)
- Jean-Frédéric Neuburger (2010)

=== O ===
- Steven Osborne (2002)

=== P ===
- Enrico Pace (2001 and 2002)
- Denis Pascal (2008 and 2009)
- Alfredo Perl (2001)
- Artur Pizarro (1996, 2009 and 2011)
- Jonathan Plowright (2003, 2004, 2006 and 2009)
- Michael Ponti (1987 and 1989)
- Roland Pöntinen (2005, 2008 and 2011)
- Jonathan Powell (2004, 2007, 2009 and 2011)

=== R ===
- Abdel Rahman El Bacha (1996)
- Bernard Ringeisen (1992 and 1993)
- Eliane Rodrigues (2009)
- Sandro Russo (2012)
- Hubert Rutkowski (2012)

=== S ===
- Fazıl Say (1999)
- Konstantin Scherbakov (2000, 2001 and 2009)
- Eckard Sellheim (1987)
- Igor Shukov (1990, 1992, 1994 and 1996)
- Henri Sigfridsson (2001)
- Abbey Simon (1990 and 1991)
- Ronald Smith (1989 and 1995)
- Trevor Smith (1993)
- Olga Solovieva (2011)
- Evgeny Soifertis (2007)
- Sontraud Speidel (1991)
- Edna Stern (2004)
- Kathryn Scott (1996, 1997 and 1999)
- Vladimir Stoupel (1999)
- Arturo Sudbrack Jamardo (2003)
- Jeffrey Swann (1997)
- Roberto Szidon (1988)

=== T ===
- Hiroaki Takenouchi (2007 and 2010)
- Claudius Tanski (1990)
- Seta Tanyel (1995 and 2003)
- Igor Tchetuev (2011)
- Amir Tebenikhin (2012)
- Nina Tichman (1988 and 2009)
- François-Joël Thiollier (2007)

=== U ===
- Anatol Ugorski (2004)
- Fredrik Ullén (2001 and 2003)

=== V ===
- Lev Vinocour (2008)
- Nadejda Vlaeva (2006 and 2011)
- Franz Vorraber (1998)

=== W ===
- Nicholas Walker (1999 and 2002)
- Janice Weber (1990 and 2009)
- Peter Westenholz (1988)
