= Guillaume Stengel =

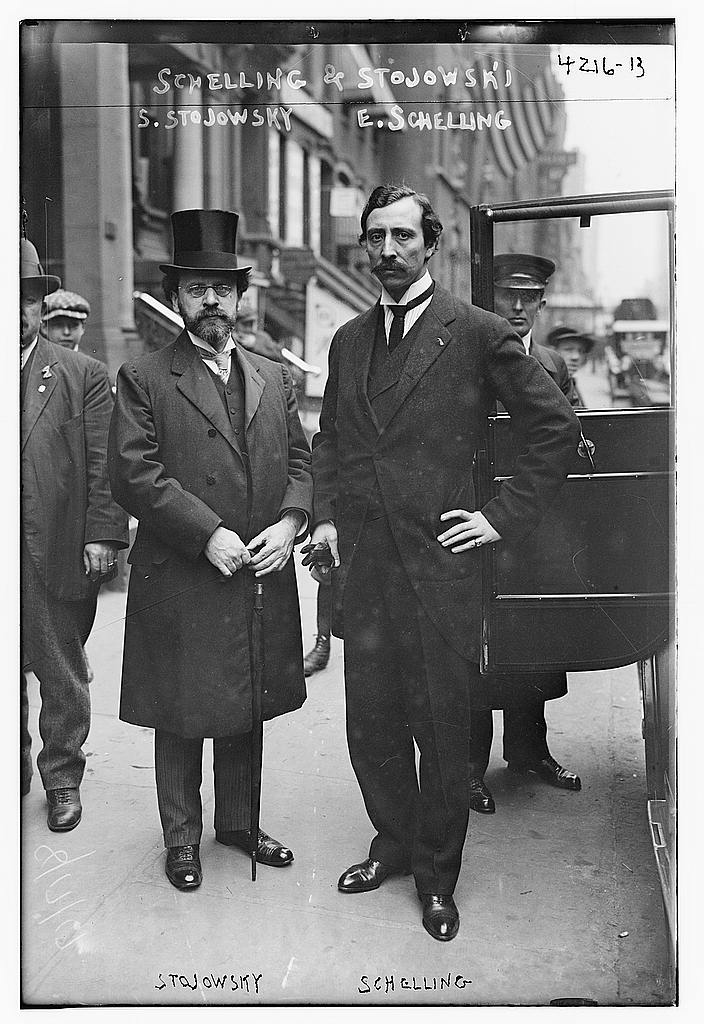
Zygmunt Stojowski and Ernest Schelling on May 18, 1917, for the funeral of Guillaume Stengel

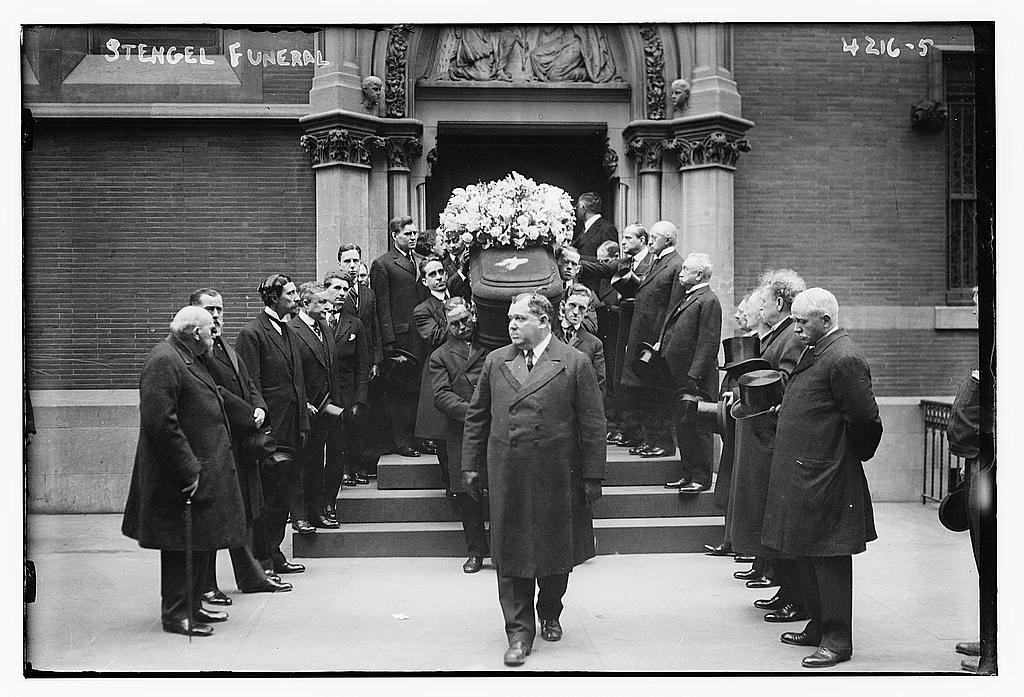
Guillaume Stengel funeral on May 18, 1917

Wilhelm Ludwig "Guillaume" Stengel (August 7, 1846 - May 15, 1917) was a musician and a music teacher.

== Biography ==
He was born on August 7, 1846, in Lviv. Marcella Sembrich become one of his students and they married in 1877.

He became ill from blood poisoning from a carbuncle that developed from a scratch on his lip. He had his first operation on May 6, 1917. His health improved temporarily.

He died at his apartment in the Hotel Gotham in Manhattan on May 15, 1917, from the blood poisoning after his third operation. His funeral was at the Church of St. Mary the Virgin in Manhattan and the temporary burial until the end of the war was at Woodlawn Cemetery. He had 20 pallbearers including Paul Drennan Cravath, Harry Harkness Flagler, Zygmunt Stojowski, Ernest Schelling and Ignacy Jan Paderewski.
