= Homage (arts) =

Art demonstration of respect or dedication to someone or something

Homage (/ˈhɒmɪdʒ/ or /ˈɒmɪdʒ/) is a show or demonstration of respect or dedication to someone or something, sometimes by simple declaration but often by some more oblique reference, artistic or poetic. The term is often used in the arts, where one author or artist shows respect to another by allusion or imitation; this is often spelled like and pronounced similar to the original French hommage (/oʊˈmɑːʒ/).

== Description ==
It was originally a declaration of fealty in the feudal system – swearing that one was the man (French: homme), or subordinate, of the feudal lord. The concept then became used figuratively for an acknowledgement of quality or superiority. For example, a man might give homage to a lady, so honouring her beauty and other graces. In German scholarship, followers of a great scholar developed the custom of honouring their mentor by producing papers for a festschrift dedicated to him.

In music, homage can take the form of a composition (Homage to Paderewski), a tribute album (Homage to Charles Parker) or a sample. Digital techniques used to generate many forms of media make it easy to borrow from other works, and this remediation may be used in homage to them.

== See also ==
- Allusion
- Intertextuality
- Pastiche
