= Enrico Pace =

Italian pianist of international renown (born 1967)

- Born: 1967 (age 58–59); Rimini, Italy
- Occupation: Classical pianist

Enrico Pace (born 1967) is an Italian pianist of international renown.

== Biography ==
Enrico Pace was born in Rimini, Italy in 1967. He studied piano with Franco Scala, mainly at the Rossini Conservatory in Pesaro. He was also active as conductor and composer. In 1987 he won first prize at the International Yamaha Competition in Stresa and in 1989 he was first prize winner of the Second International Franz Liszt Piano Competition. Later Pace performed in many European cities and played with the symphonic orchestras of Sydney and Melbourne on an Australian tour. He also worked with the Warsaw Philharmonic Orchestra and with the Noord-Nederlands Orchestra.

From 1997/1998, he started a long term co-operation with violinist Frank Peter Zimmermann, with whom Pace gave concerts in many European, South-American and Far Eastern countries. Other musicians with whom he often performs are violinist Leonidas Kavakos, horn player Marie-Luise Neunecker and pianist Igor Roma.

Pace has given many recitals in Europe, among others in the Amsterdam Concert Hall (he already performed four times there in the Master Pianists Series), Milan (Sala Verdi and Teatro alla Scala), Rome, Brescia/Bergamo, Florence, Berlin, Munich, Dortmund, Dublin and in some South American cities. As part of a Maurizio Pollini project, Pace gave a recital in Salzburg in 1999 for the Salzburger Festspiele (Festival Concerts). In the summer of 2001 his debut recitals at the Festivals of Husum (Raritäten der Klaviermusik, for rare piano music) and La Roque-d'Anthéron made a profound impression and he was immediately invited to perform at the 2002 recitals as well. He regularly performs with prominent orchestras, such as the Rotterdam Philharmonic Orchestra, The Radio Philharmonic Orchestra and Radio Symphony Orchestra, the Symphony Orchestras of Sydney and Melbourne (as part of a tour in Australia and New-Zealand), the Berlin Symphony Orchestra, the MDR Symphony Orchestra of Leipzig, the Philharmonic Orchestra of Warsaw, the Czech State Philharmonic Orchestra of Brno, the orchestras of Johannesburg and Cape Town, Amsterdam Sinfonietta, the Gelders Orchestra, the Brabants Orchestra, The Limburg Symphony Orchestra, the Northern Netherlands Orchestra, the Noordhollands Philharmonic Orchestra and the National Youth Orchestra.

In the season of 2003/2004, Pace made several debuts: with the Munich Philharmonic conducted by Yakov Kreizberg, the Bamberger Symphony Orchestra conducted by Walter Weller and the BBC Philharmonic conducted by Gianandrea Noseda. Pace also worked with, among others, the conductors Andrey Boreyko, Mark Elder, Janos Fürst, Junichi Hirokami, Eliahu Inbal, Jan Latham-Koenig, Kazimirz Kord, Alexander Liebreich, Gianandrea Noseda, Tuomas Ollila, Tadaaki Otaka, Stanislav Skrowaczewski, Bruno Weil en Antoni Wit.

Apart from doing concerts with orchestras, Pace has also played chamber music: among others he played with the Shostakovich Quartet, the Vanbrugh Quartet and the Prometeo Quartet and he participated several times in Isabelle van Keulen's Delft Chamber Music Festival. So far pianist Leif Ove Andsnes invited him twice to perform at his chamber music festival in Risor. Pace also performed at the chamber music festivals of Kuhmo (Finland), Stresa (Italy), West Cork (Ireland) and Moritzburg (Germany).

Pace recorded in 2011 his first double CD as soloist for London label Piano Classics, recording Liszt's Années de pèlerinage – Suisse and Italie.
