= Frank Peter Zimmermann =

German violinist

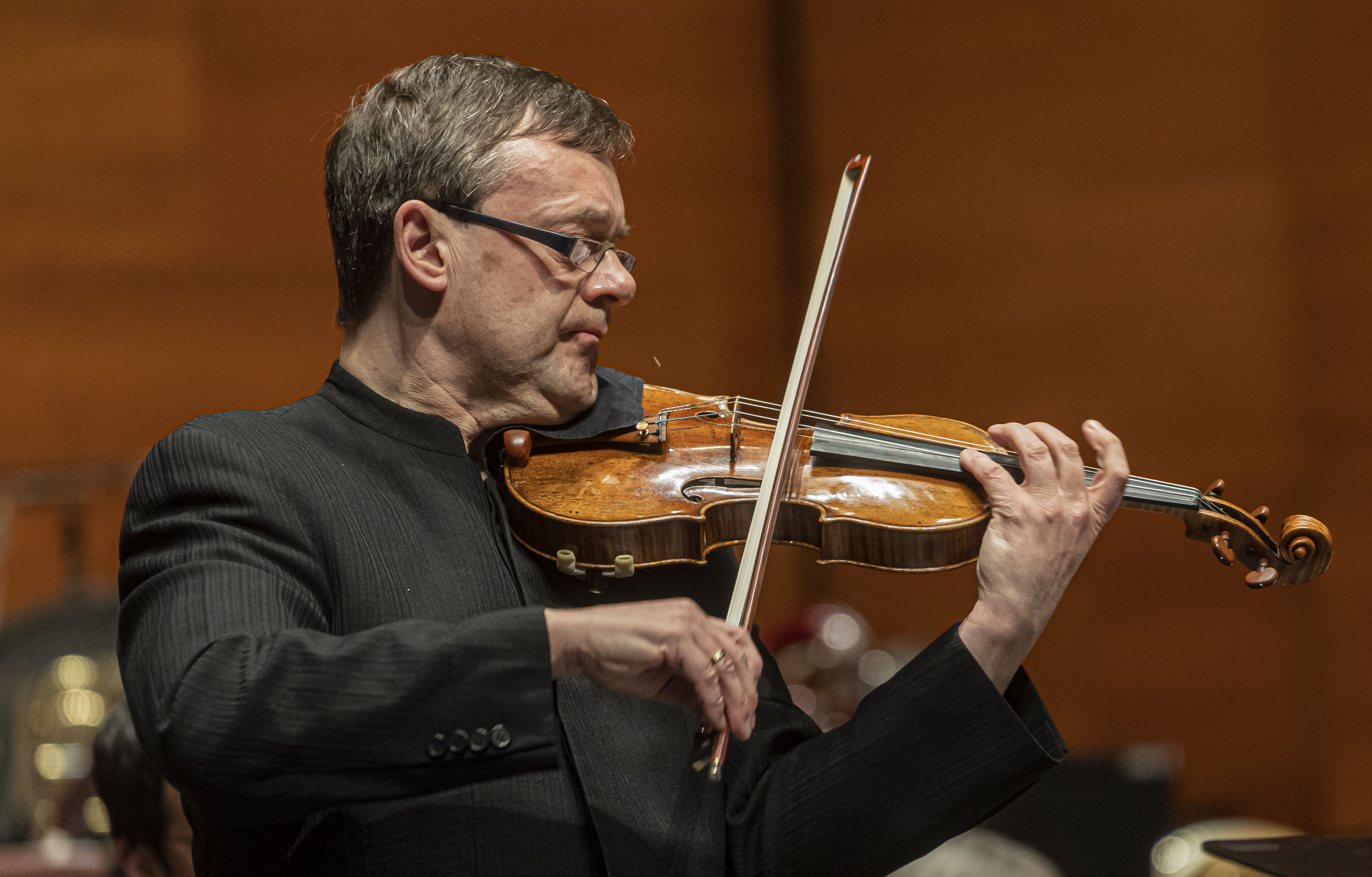
Zimmermann in 2023

Frank Peter Zimmermann (born 27 February 1965) is a German violinist.

== Childhood ==
He was born in Duisburg, West Germany, and started playing the violin when he was five years old, giving his first concert with orchestra at the age of 10.

Since he finished his studies with Valery Valentinovich Gradow, Saschko Gawriloff, and Herman Krebbers in 1983, Frank Peter Zimmermann has been performing with a considerable number of major orchestras and conductors in the world.

== Highlights ==
Highlights include engagements with, among others, the New York Philharmonic, Boston Symphony Orchestra and Paavo Berglund, the National Symphony Orchestra Washington and Leonard Slatkin, the Chicago Symphony Orchestra and Manfred Honeck, the Berlin Philharmonic Orchestra and Bernard Haitink, the Philharmonia Orchestra and Wolfgang Sawallisch and the Bavarian Radio Symphony Orchestra and Mariss Jansons.

In February 2003, Frank Peter Zimmermann and the Berlin Philharmonic Orchestra conducted by Peter Eötvös gave the world premiere of the violin concerto 'en sourdine' by the German composer Matthias Pintscher.

== Recitals ==
Apart from engagements with orchestra, Zimmermann also gives recitals. Since 1998 his regular partner is Italian pianist Enrico Pace. Other regular chamber music partners are Heinrich Schiff, Piotr Anderszewski and Christian Zacharias.

== Stradivarius ==
From 2001 to 2015, Zimmermann played a 1711 Stradivarius violin known as the "Lady Inchiquin", previously played by Fritz Kreisler. The violin had been loaned to Zimmermann by Düsseldorf-based bank WestLB AG, but was reclaimed in February 2015 at the termination of the loan contract by the bank's legal successor, Portigon Financial Services, owing to the bank's bankruptcy.

In January 2016 Zimmermann was loaned the 1727 "Général Dupont" Stradivarius for an initial period of two years. Also known as the "Grumiaux" Stradivarius, it had been owned by the celebrated Belgian virtuoso Arthur Grumiaux. The instrument is owned by entrepreneur, philanthropist and amateur violinist Mr Yu, who purchased it in February 2015 through Rare Violins of New York for an undisclosed sum – making the violin the first Stradivarius to be owned by a private individual in mainland China.

In July 2016, Zimmermann regained the 1711 ex-Fritz Kreisler 'Lady Inchiquin' Stradivarius violin.
