= The Victory Ball =

Anti-war poem written by Alfred Noyes

"The Victory Ball" (sometimes referred to as "The Victory dance") is an anti-war poem written by Alfred Noyes and published by The Saturday Evening Post in 1920. The poem is based on a celebration thrown by the British aristocracy after the Armistice ending WW1, in which Alfred Noyes was invited and in attendance. It tells a tale of young casualties of World War I watching over a group of people celebrating the end of the war with no consideration to the fallen.

Noyes, while being an anti-war advocate, still supported the allied troops. The Victory Ball's aim was not to bash the war effort, but to demonstrate the disconnect between the soldiers dying in the trenches and the rich politicians who sent them there but were miles away from the actual conflict.

The American composer Ernest Schelling wrote a tone poem based on The Victory Ball. Noyes's poem was turned into a ballet by Benjamin Zemach in 1966, and re-appropriated during the Vietnam War.
