= Lisle Combe =

Coordinates: 50.5882°N 1.2347°W

Lisle Combe is an English country house on the Undercliff near Ventnor, Isle of Wight. In 1929, Alfred Noyes resided there; Hugh Noyes lived there subsequently. The house was first built in 1839 for the second son of Lord Yarborough. It was originally rectangular. A wing addition in 1843 included a single-storey link. Another renovation followed in 1849. The many-gabled house of sandstone features fretted bargeboards, windows with square-sided bays and small oriels, a veranda, and brick work.
