= Schloss vor Husum =

Castle in Husum

Coordinates: 54.4798°N 9.0503°E

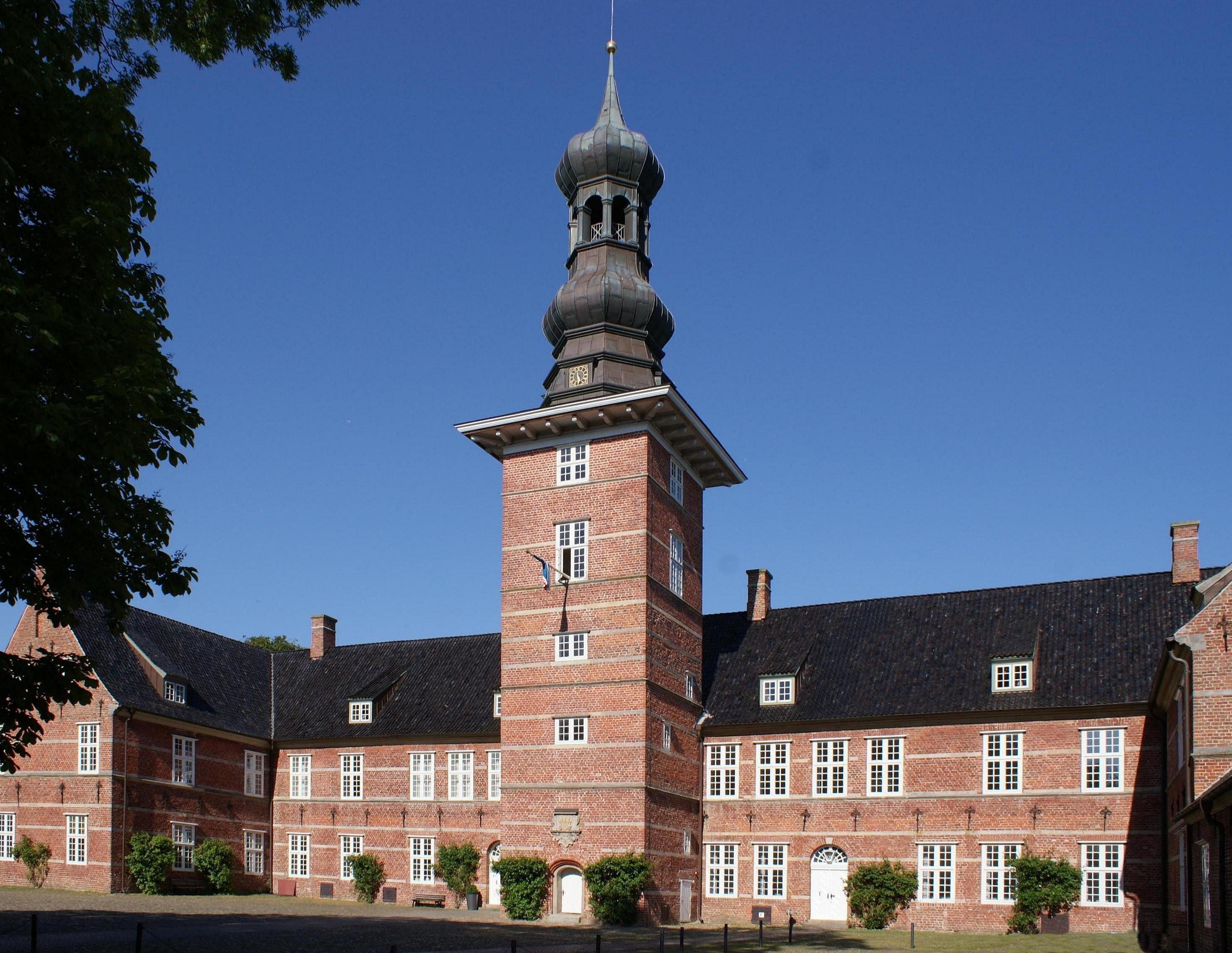
The palace outside Husum, view of the courtyard

The Schloss vor Husum is a palace outside of Husum, Nordfriesland district, Schleswig-Holstein, Germany, when it was erected in the 16th century. It was initially a secondary residence of the ducal house of Schleswig-Holstein-Gottorf and served as an occasional residence for the Danish royal family during the 18th and 19th centuries. It also accommodated administrative offices, which gradually expanded and after 1864 occupied most of the building. The offices remained until the 20th century, and the castle came to be known as the "royal palace".

It is the only preserved palace on the west coast of Schleswig-Holstein, and is open to the public as a museum and cultural center. The palace park is a well-known attraction throughout the region, and is especially popular when the crocuses bloom in spring. It is the venue of the annual Raritäten der Klaviermusik annual festival.

== History ==
=== Prehistory ===
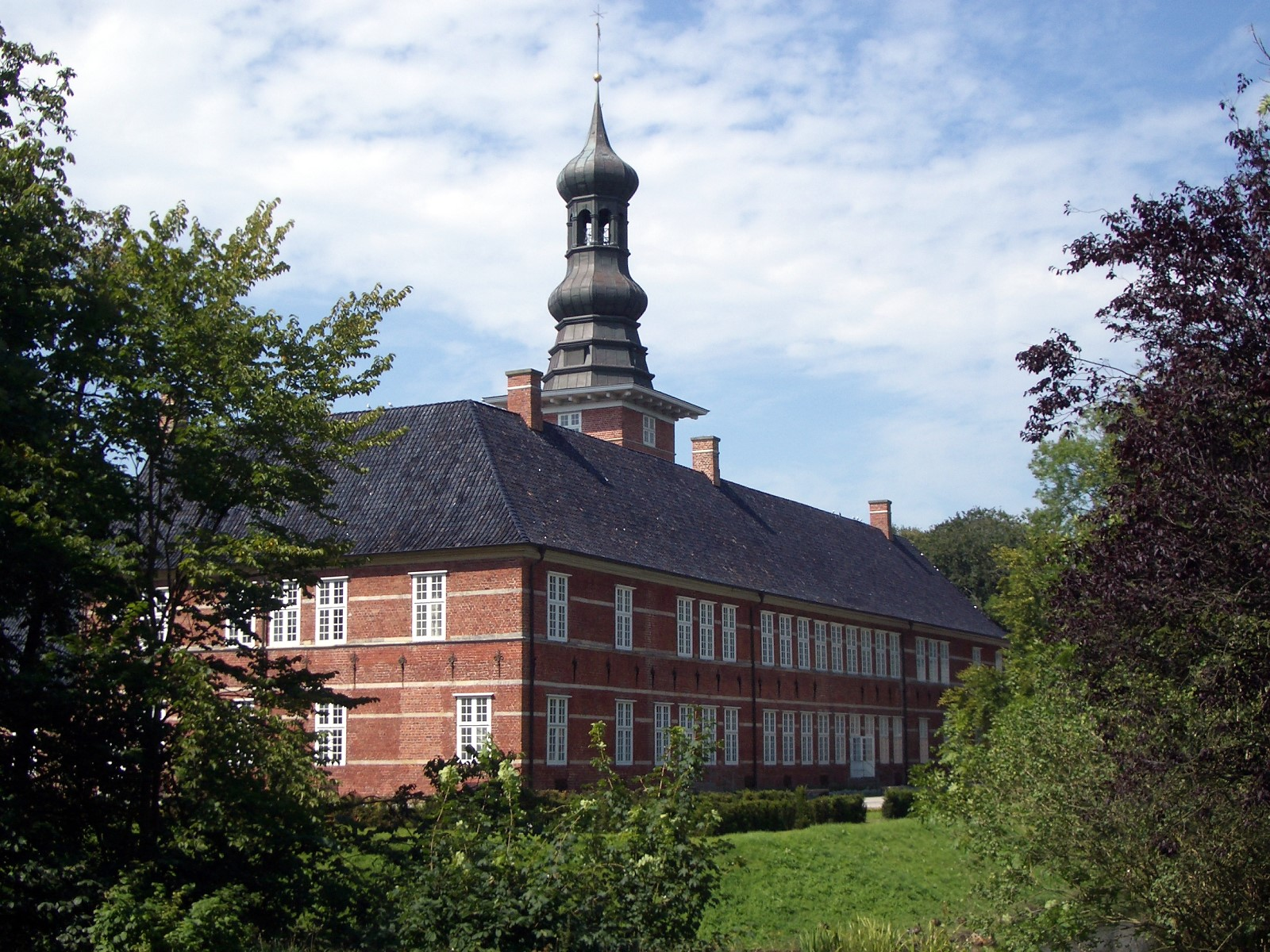
The castle in front of Husum, view of the garden-side facades of the southern side and central wings

On the site of the current palace, there stood the so-called "Graukloster" (Grey Monastery) since the late 15th century. It was likely established around 1494 and belonged to the Franciscan order, named after the color of the habit of religion. Along with the Franciscan monasteries in Lunden, St. Maria in Kiel, and the Graukloster in Schleswig, it formed the Custody of Holstein within the Danish province of Dacia and, in 1520, became part of the Franciscan reform province of Saxonia S. Crucis. Like many other monasteries in Schleswig-Holstein, all of these were dissolved during the Reformation. The former monastery building was repurposed as a house for the poor and sick from 1528 onwards. The revenues from this establishment financed the founding of a Latin school at the suggestion of the reformer Hermann Tast.

Duke Adolf of Schleswig-Holstein-Gottorf, the first ruler of the Duchy of Schleswig-Holstein-Gottorf established in 1544, emphasized his rank - as he was a half-brother of the Danish king Christian III - with an abundance of magnificent Dutch Renaissance buildings. Among the numerous structures built during his reign were the Reinbek Castle, Tönning Castle, and the northern wing of the previously medieval Gottorf Castle. He also planned a new palace in Husum, choosing the site of the former monastery as the location, similar to the approach taken in Reinbek. For this purpose, the poorhouse was demolished, and the "Gasthaus zum Ritter St. Jürgen" (Inn of the Knight St. Jürgen) was established in Husum, which still exists today as a nursing home.

=== Residence of the Gottorfer ===
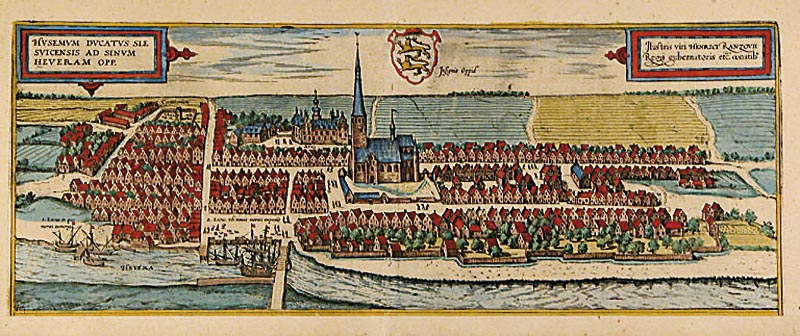
Castle and town of Husum at the end of the 16th century. Engraving by Frans Hogenberg

The Husum Castle was built for Adolf I from 1577 to 1582. During that time, the site was still situated outside the city district, which explains the current name of the castle comes from, which gained common usage only in the 19th century. The castle was designed to serve as a residence for the ducal court during their stays on the West Coast. The areas of Eiderstedt, parts of North Frisia, and northern Dithmarschen formed the largest contiguous possession of the Gottorf territory, which was spread across Schleswig and Holstein. After Duke Adolf I, his successors Friedrich II, Philipp, and Johann Adolf also used the Husum Castle. However, the main ancestral castle and seat of government remained at Gottorf near Schleswig. The Husum residence did not significant role in the region's history.

Since the 17th century, Husum Castle has been designated as a "Leibgedinge" (a widow's residence), similar to Reinbek Castle. Duchess Augusta, the widow of Johann Adolf, regularly resided in the Husum Castle from 1610 to 1639. She acquired the neighboring estates of Arlewatt, Hoyerswort, and the Roten Haubarg for her support. Under her and the subsequent Duchess Maria Elisabeth, the town and the castle experienced a short cultural boom. Artists were brought to the court, and the castle was expanded and furnished in an early Baroque style. Maria Elisabeth, the widow of Friedrich III, lived almost exclusively here from 1660 to 1684. After her death, the castle was rarely used, such as during the period between 1710 and 1713 when it served as the residence of the bailiff of Husum and Schwabstedt and later the Holstein-Gottorf privy council Henning Friedrich von Bassewitz. Otherwise, it mostly remained vacant.

=== Danish-owned castle ===
In 1721, following the lost Great Northern War, the Husum Castle and the town of Husum came under the ownership of the Kingdom of Denmark. The Danish royal house, due to this political development and the partial disempowerment of the Gottorf family, which resulted in the acquisition of several castles in the Duchy of Schleswig, had only a moderate interest in maintaining buildings located far from the Danish mainland. For example, the Tönning Castle was demolished, the baroque renovations of the Gottorf Castle were halted, and the old residence was designated as the seat of the Danish governors. Meanwhile, Husum Castle remained vacant and was minimally maintained. Significant changes occurred when Danish King Frederick V expressed interest in occasionally staying in the western part of the duchies. He acquired the Wasmer Palace in Glückstadt, where the local castle had already been demolished in 1708, and planned a modernization of the Husum Castle. These plans were implemented in the major renovation works carried out from 1750 to 1752. The old and partly dilapidated Husum Renaissance castle was renovated in a reduced form by the state architect Otto Johann Müller, incorporating baroque elements to align with the spirit of the time.

Since 1752, the castle also housed the Husum district's administrative offices, including the district administrator's residence. He and his family lived in the rooms north of the tower, alongside the families of other royal officials. The administrative offices consisted of three rooms on the ground floor. The rooms south of the tower on both floors were intended for potential visits by the king. While the administrative offices remained in the castle, the use by the Danish royal house was limited to a few visits. However, during the 18th century, the building was once again neglected. In 1792, the main tower had to be largely dismantled. In the first half of the 19th century, the castle saw an increased usage for royal visits. Notably, King Frederick VI, frequently visited Husum in the 1820s, while Christian VIII made deliberate efforts to visit Husum in the 1840s (he died in 1848). Under Christian VIII, the castle underwent partial modernization. Theodor Storm vividly described the visit of the king in 1845 in a letter to his then-fiancée Constanze Esmarch.

=== Administration building ===
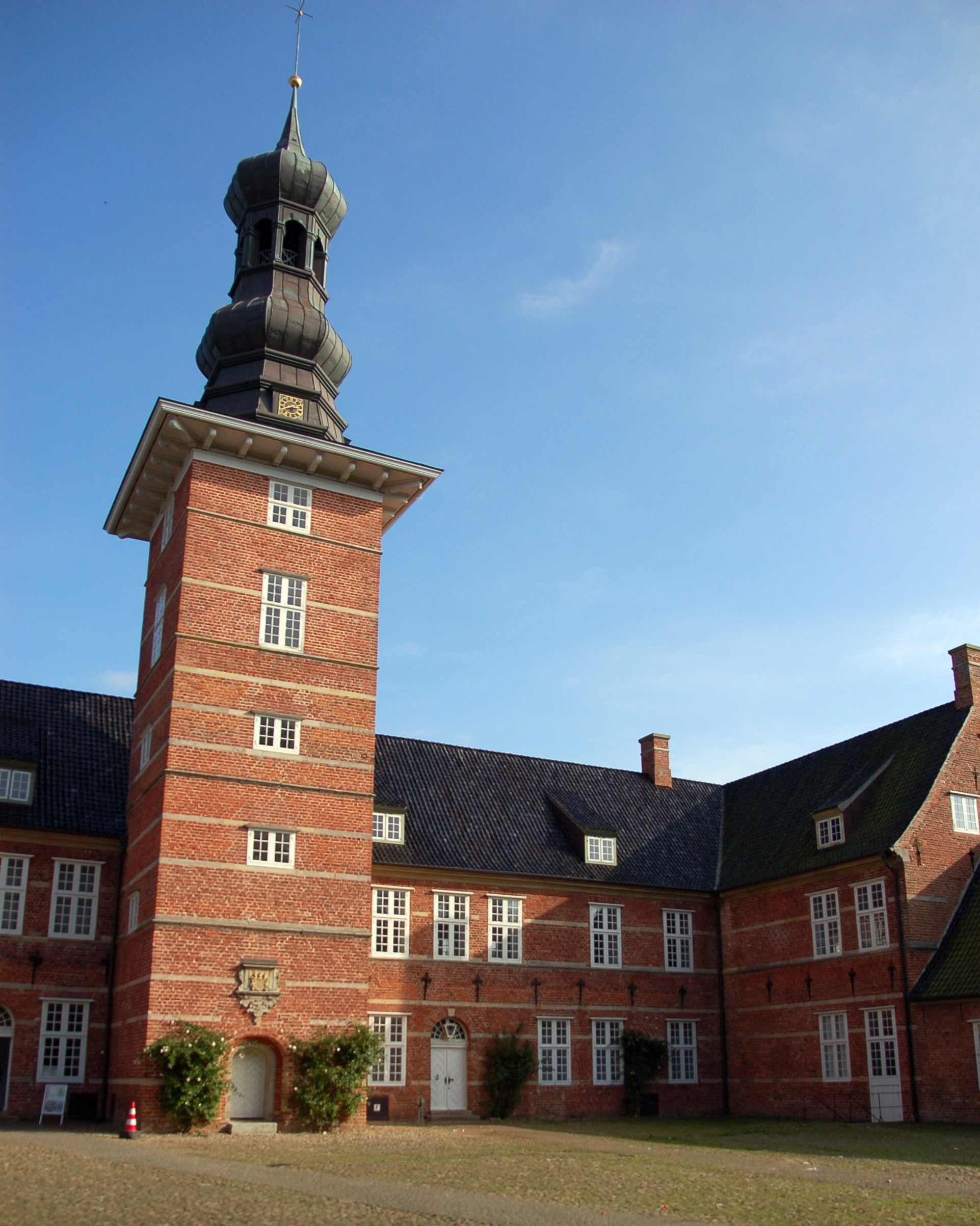
After almost 200 years without a dome and upper floors, the tower was reconstructed in 1980

In the 19th century, following the German-Danish War, Schleswig-Holstein came under Prussian administration. The district administration of the Husum district and the district court moved into the castle. Theodor Storm served as a district judge and councilor in the castle from 1867 to 1880. In 1871, the writer Fanny zu Reventlow, the daughter of the district administrator Ludwig Graf zu Reventlow, was born in the castle. After the end of the German Empire, the Husum district purchased the building from the former crown property. Gradually, the administration expanded and occupied almost the entire house, except for the district administrator's apartment. The castle survived the World Wars of the 20th century without destruction.

After the merger of the districts Eiderstedt, Husum, and Südtondern in 1970 to form the new district of North Frisia, with its headquarters in Husum, a new district administration was built on the site of the nearby former cattle market. The castle underwent restoration work from 1973 to the 1980s and was given a cultural purpose. Under the direction of Danish architect Karsten Rønnow, the aim was to restore the appearance of the building after the 1750-1751 reconstruction. Due to subsequent alterations to the building and the associated costing, it was no longer possible to restore Husum Castle to its Renaissance-era condition.

=== Usage ===
In 2003, the Förderverein Schloss vor Husum was founded, dedicated to the preservation of the listed building and further expanding its usability. The castle is home to the Department of Culture and the Music School of the North Frisia district, as well as the North Frisia Foundation. The castle museum showcases the former royal reception rooms, the castle chapel, and other rooms with their furnishings. The collections of the museum are constantly being supplemented. It is open daily, except on Mondays, from April to October, and only on weekends and between Christmas and New Year during the winter months.

The castle is part of the North Frisia Museum Association and is involved in a variety of public events. In addition to the museum operations, regular concerts (such as the music festival "Rarities of Piano Music"), theater performances, and changing special exhibitions take place here, all under the restored roof trusses since 2008. The chapel and the Fortuna Hall are rented out for weddings. In the former kitchen wing, there is a café operated by trainees from the nearby Theodor-Schäfer Vocational Training Center. The annual crocus bloom in the park is celebrated with the Crocus Blossom Festival.

== Palace complex ==
The palace is located on an island surrounded by a moat, which was once part of a simple fortification. The inner courtyard was equipped with single-story outbuildings and a small gatehouse on the western side. In front of the island, there used to be a large farmyard, but its buildings were mostly demolished in the 18th century. Only the former gatehouse and the cavalier house have survived as remnants of the former outbuildings outside the island.

=== Architecture ===
The palace was built from 1577 to 1582. It is a two-story, three-winged building with a distinctive central tower. A long central wing is surrounded by two shorter side wings, with the southern wing extended by a single-story utility building, and the northern wing, known as the kitchen building, set back from the courtyard. The layout of the main building resembles a large "E." Built in the style of the Dutch Renaissance, the red brick building underwent several modernizations and renovations in 1612, 1750, and 1792. Throughout its over 400-year history, the palace served more as an administrative building than a princely residence. The design of a main building with two separate farm buildings can be found 200 years later in Matthieu Soiron's Wickrath Castle, built between 1746 and 1772.

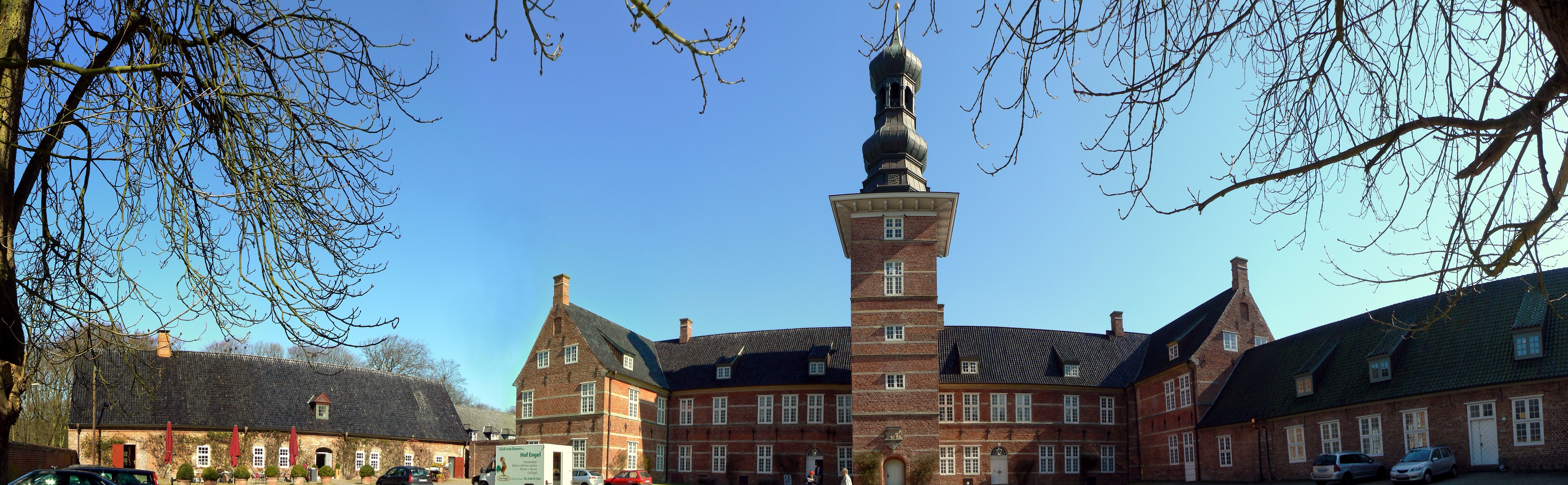
Panorama of the courtyard

=== Reinbek ===
The palace is the direct successor of the Reinbek Castle, which was completed in 1576 and also built by Duke Adolf I. It shares some similarities with Reinbek Castle. Both were among the most advanced buildings in the Gottorf part of the duchies when they were completed. Open three-winged layouts were not common in this region before; the traditional type of noble residence in the region until then was the so-called "Doppelhaus". The facades of both buildings are from red brick and divided by horizontal bands of sandstone. The windows once had stone-framed mullions, and the towers are crowned with sweeping hoods.

The architects of both buildings are not known by name, but it is believed that they were built by a succession of Dutch architects, possibly under the direction of Peter van Mastricht. These architects added relatively new elements of the Dutch Renaissance style to the Gottorf dominion.

While Reinbek Castle, located in a remote exclave, was intended for shorter stays and met simpler requirements, Schloss vor husum was planned as a representative residence on the West Coast. It was not far from the ancestral seat of the ducal house, Gottorf Castle, which at that time resembled more of a fortress than a comfortable noble residence. Nevertheless, Schloss vor Husum experienced a similar history to Reinbek Castle. After a brief courtly phase, both served as widow's residences and then as administrative seats and underwent significant architectural alterations in the 18th and 19th centuries. Both buildings were restored in the 20th century and now serve as cultural centers for public purposes.

=== Ducal Renaissance ===
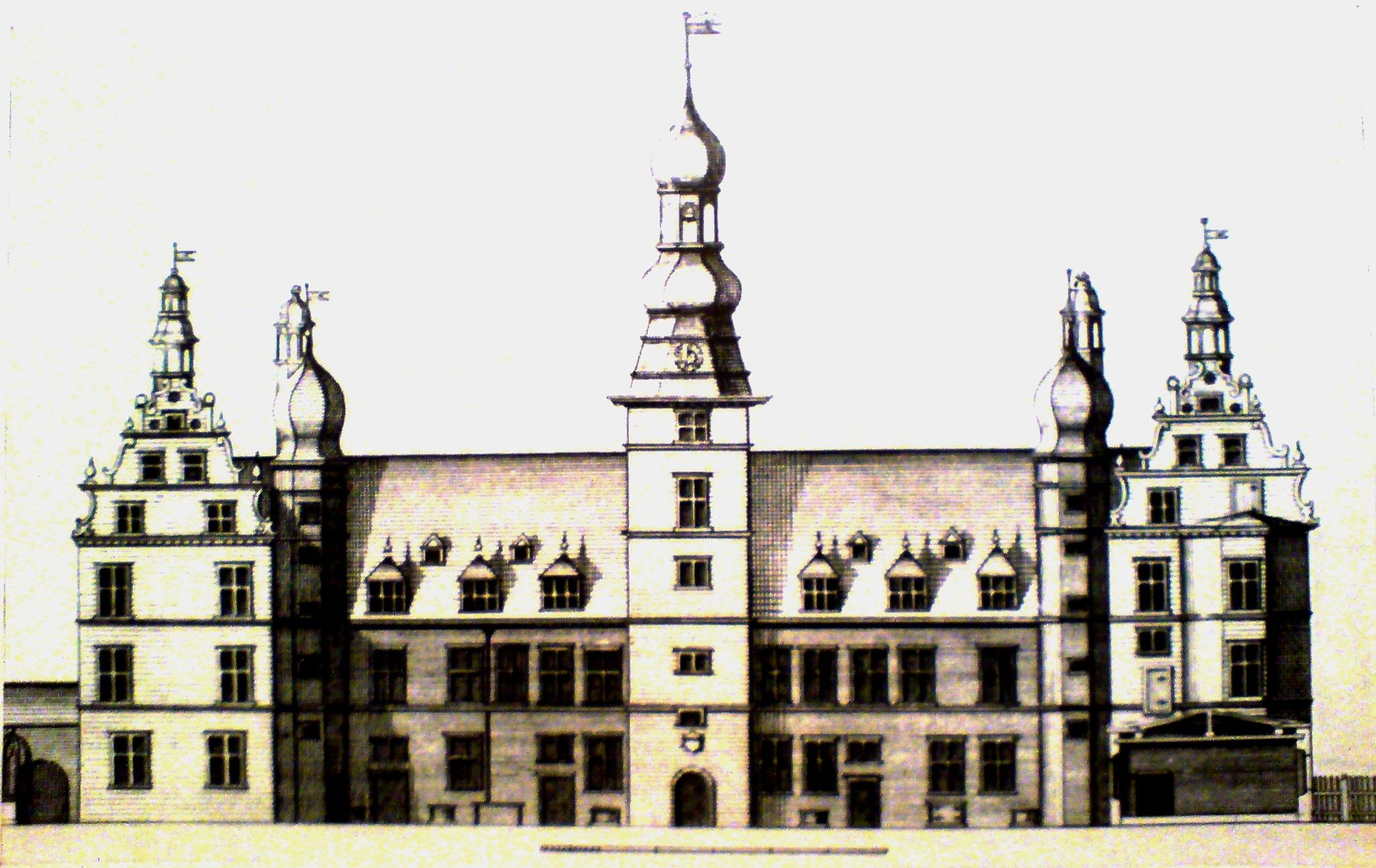
The Schloss before 1750, engraving from Laurids de Thuras "Den danske Vitruvius"

The palace features one of the first symmetrical structures in the duchies. This architectural design was an innovation in the history of the region and was not found in the previous building in Reinbek. The symmetrical layout was partially lost through the renovations carried out under Duchess Augusta, who had the lower wings constructed. The palace complex before the rebuilding in the middle of the 18th century is thus the result of a building process comprising several phases.

When the palace was completed in the 16th century, the shorter side wings were originally one floor higher than the long central building. The gables of these wings were embellished with ornate and decorative sweeping tail work, similar to what can still be seen on the gatehouse. Due to the higher side wings and a taller roof structure, the palace had different proportions than it does today. Two slender towers with onion-shaped domes were inserted into the angles between the central wing and the shorter side buildings—like a tower found in the southern courtyard corner of Reinbek Castle—and several turrets sat on the high roof ridge. The symmetrical division of the building followed a concept: the long central wing originally housed the grand halls of the palace and was accessed through the central staircase tower, while the northern wing served the duchess and the southern wing served the duke. Both side wings had their own spiral staircases leading to the residential apartments, located at the corners of the courtyard. Until the mid-18th century, it resembled other Nordic Renaissance residences like Rosenborg or Frederiksborg with its multi-towered silhouette.

=== Reduction from 1750 ===
From 1750 onwards, the castle underwent significant simplification due to various structural damages. The renovations completely transformed the grand courtyard façade, which featured two corner towers and a mighty main tower. The slender courtyard staircase towers, the no longer necessary outbuildings, and a gatehouse located in front of the courtyard were demolished. The roof ridge was lowered, the roof turrets were removed, and the height of the side wings was reduced. The stone-framed Renaissance windows were replaced with wooden frames. In 1792, the upper floors and the spire of the central tower were removed, and further minor alterations followed under Christian VIII. At the same time as the external changes, the old room sequences were modernized in the Baroque style, thus abandoning the ducal division. In later years, the salons were gradually transformed into administrative rooms.

Due to the transformations that were made to the palace over the centuries, the building's former splendor was only imaginable for a period. After being a mere torso for almost 200 years, the palace regained some of its former glory through restoration efforts in the second half of the 20th century. The visual restoration of the tower helmet in 1980 brought back the appearance of the palace to its state in 1752.

=== Interior ===
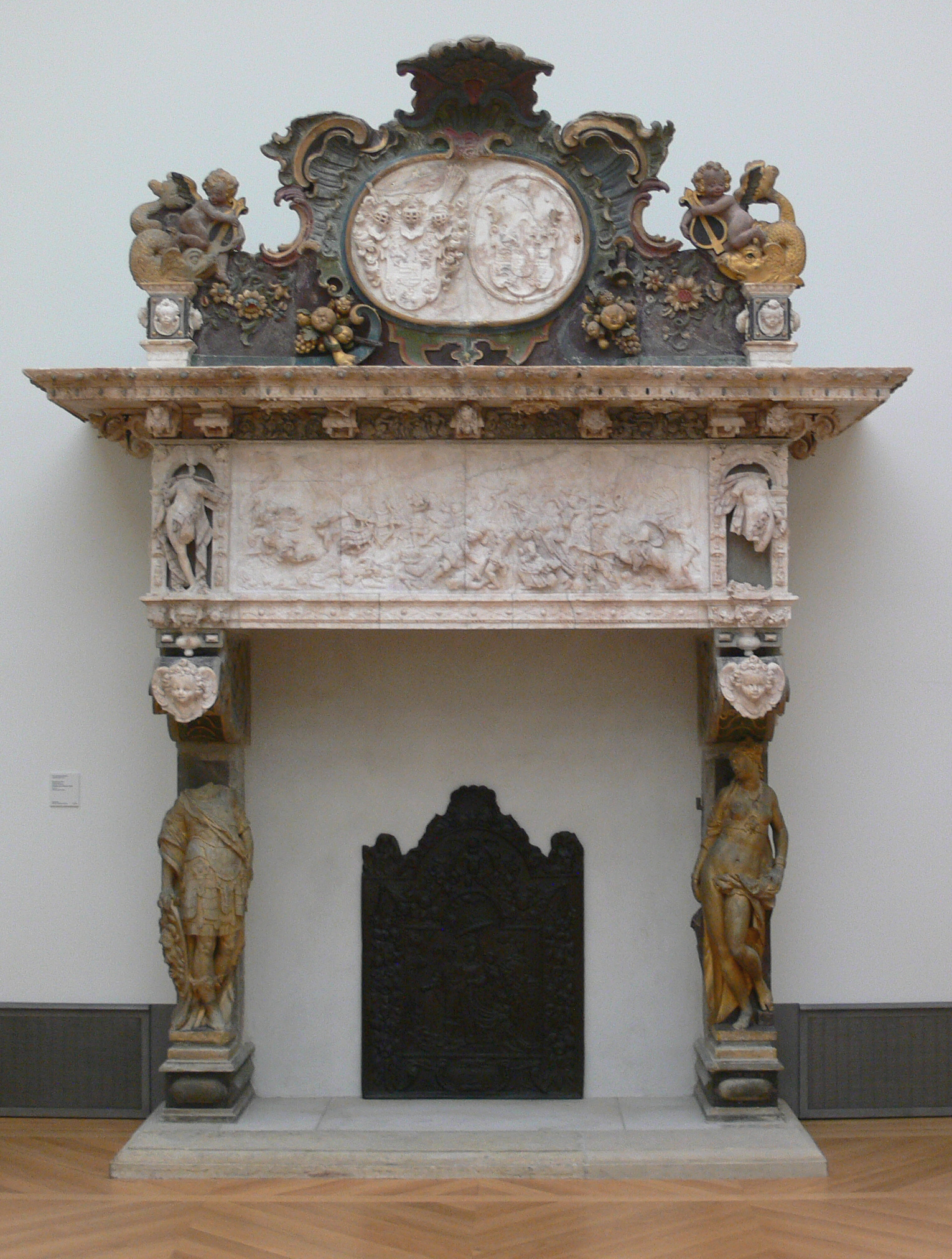
The original of the agony chimney (image) is in the Bode Museum in Berlin after it was sold in 1919. A copy was made for Schloss vor Husum in 1988-1992. 1988 – 1992 restoration investigations as well as security and conservation work on the original chimney in the Bode Museum in Berlin before the molding and execution of the color reconstruction of the polychrome version according to findings from 1753, taking into account the aging aesthetics of the cast chimney set up in 1992 in Schloss vor Husum, North Friesland. Dipl. restorer Gottfried Grafe

Upon the completion of construction, the palace was a modern Renaissance-style residence, adorned with painted beamed ceilings in the living spaces. In the 17th century, the widows of the dukes lavishly furnished it with inventory lists in 1710 counting 598 paintings, for example. However, only a few parts of the original furnishings have survived to this day. Apart from the royal representation rooms, the interior spaces now have a largely sober appearance.

The main entrance to the residence has always led through the portal of the central tower, which also contains the main spiral staircase, later supplemented by an open staircase. The representative rooms are located on the upper floor. The original beamed ceilings of the interior rooms were partially covered with stuccoed intermediate ceilings. The current corridors were added during the 18th-century alterations, allowing for better access to the rooms, which were previously directly connected to each other. Under King Christian VIII, the rooms on the ground floor were renovated by the state building inspector Wilhelm Friedrich Meyer and received new representative doors, while an alcove from that period is still preserved in the current chapel. During the subsequent use as an administrative building, further changes were made to the room layout, and the larger halls were partly divided into small offices. These changes were reversed during the restoration phase in the late 20th century.

The largest room is the Knight's Hall, adorned with a replica of the so-called "struggle-of-death fireplace," which occupies the entire depth of the left upper floor. It is followed by the audience room and the bedroom, both rooms from the royal era, although they rarely served their purpose as representative salons. On the ground floor of the southern wing, there is the chapel, established by Duchess Augusta in 1616. The silver altar originally placed there is now in the Danish National Museum.

The most significant furnishings include the mannerist splendor fireplaces by Henni Heidtrider, remains of the ducal art collection, as well as original furniture from various epochs. The painting collection has been supplemented with numerous artworks from the Nissen Foundation, the city of Husum, private lenders, and purchases made by the supporting association, so that today around 100 paintings and graphics, mostly from the 17th century, can be seen. Among the paintings, a depiction of Alexander as a fair judge on the front wall of the upper landing stands out in terms of its quality and considerable size. The lower royal rooms display furniture from the early and mid-19th century, corresponding to the remodeling period in the 1840s, as well as paintings from the "Golden Age" of Danish painting up to works from the early 20th century.

=== Outbuildings ===
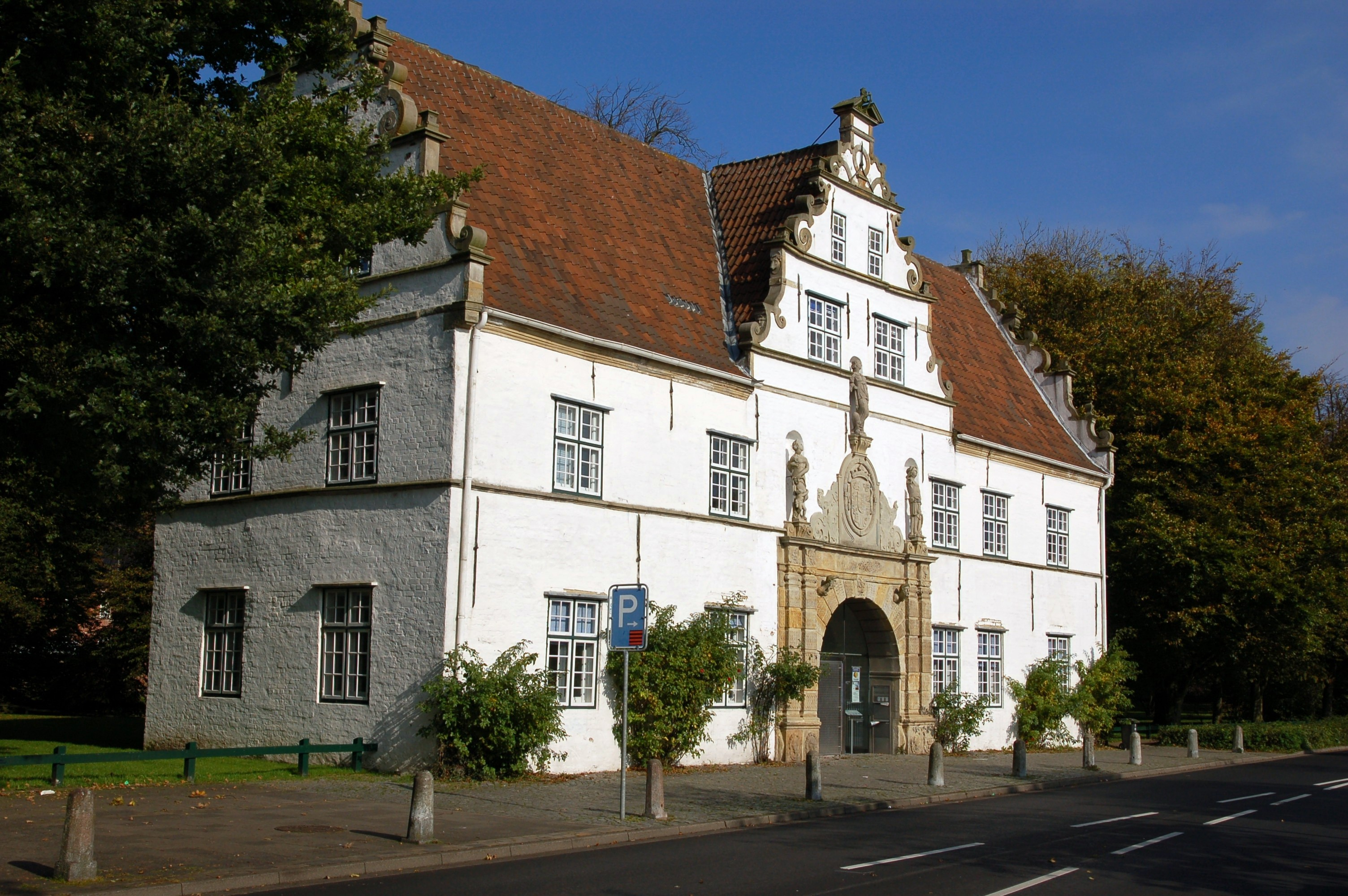
The gatehouse to the palace district has largely been preserved in its old form

From the outbuildings of the complex, only two have survived to the present day. The former gatehouse, located directly on Schlossstraße, dates to the first phase of renovations under Duchess Augusta. The building is also known as the Cornilsches Haus, named after a later owner. It is a two-story structure from 1612 that still features the characteristic swirling gables of the late Renaissance. The gatehouse's sandstone portal includes double pilasters on the sides and the coat of arms of Duchess Augusta as its crowning element. Alongside the coat of arms, there are figures of ancient goddesses: Aphrodite on the left and Athena on the right. For a long time, the niche for a third figure, Hera, remained empty as the statue was lost. However, it was rediscovered in 2003 but was broken into several pieces. A replica of the original statue now occupies the third niche, making the gatehouse the only nearly intact building of the former complex. The original statue of Hera is displayed in the staircase of the castle, while the gatehouse currently serves as an administrative building housing the local representation of the economic development agency of the North Frisia district.

Another surviving outbuilding is the so-called Kavaliershaus. This brick building from the late Renaissance era is adorned with stepped gables and originally served as a guest house. It later came into the possession of Ferdinand Tönnies and his family. The structure is now located outside the publicly accessible castle grounds and is used as a residential house.

=== Palace park ===
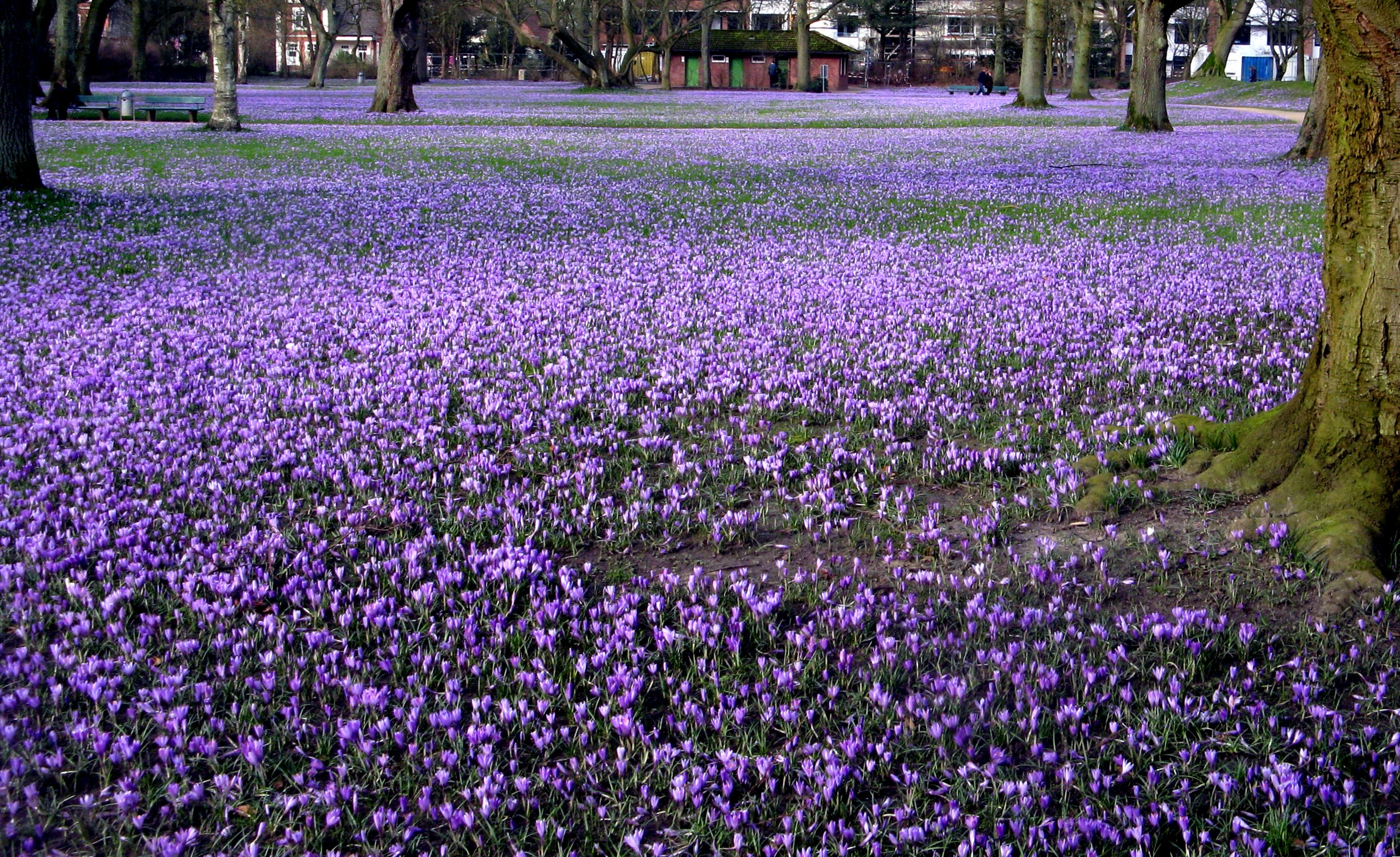
The spring crocus carpet of the Husum crocus blossom in the Great Garden

The palace is surrounded by a five-hectare park, which is one of the most famous attractions on the west coast of Schleswig-Holstein. The origin of the park dates back to the kitchen garden of the former monastery, but no traces of it remain. It is known that an initial Renaissance-style Garden was established around 1580. From 1660, Duchess Maria Elisabeth created an early Baroque Garden, which, along with an orangery and a small summer house, was also lost in later times. After 1721, parts of the area were used as agricultural land and pasture.

A preserved sandstone portal from the 17th century leads to the "Großer Garten" (Great Garden) located to the north and east. This outer garden was redesigned in its current form in 1878 by the Hamburg garden architect Rudolph Jürgens as a newly acquired municipal park for the city of Husum. The park, with its lawns, circular paths, and groups of trees, is designed as a landscape garden. The park is well-known regionally for its annual Husum crocus blossom, a mass blooming of crocuses that form a purple carpet in the park during spring, consisting of around five million Crocus napolitanus. The crocuses were likely planted during the time of the duchesses, and they may even trace back to the Gray Monks' attempts to cultivate saffron, although it was not possible with Crocus napolitanus. Crocuses have survived as stink plants to this day.

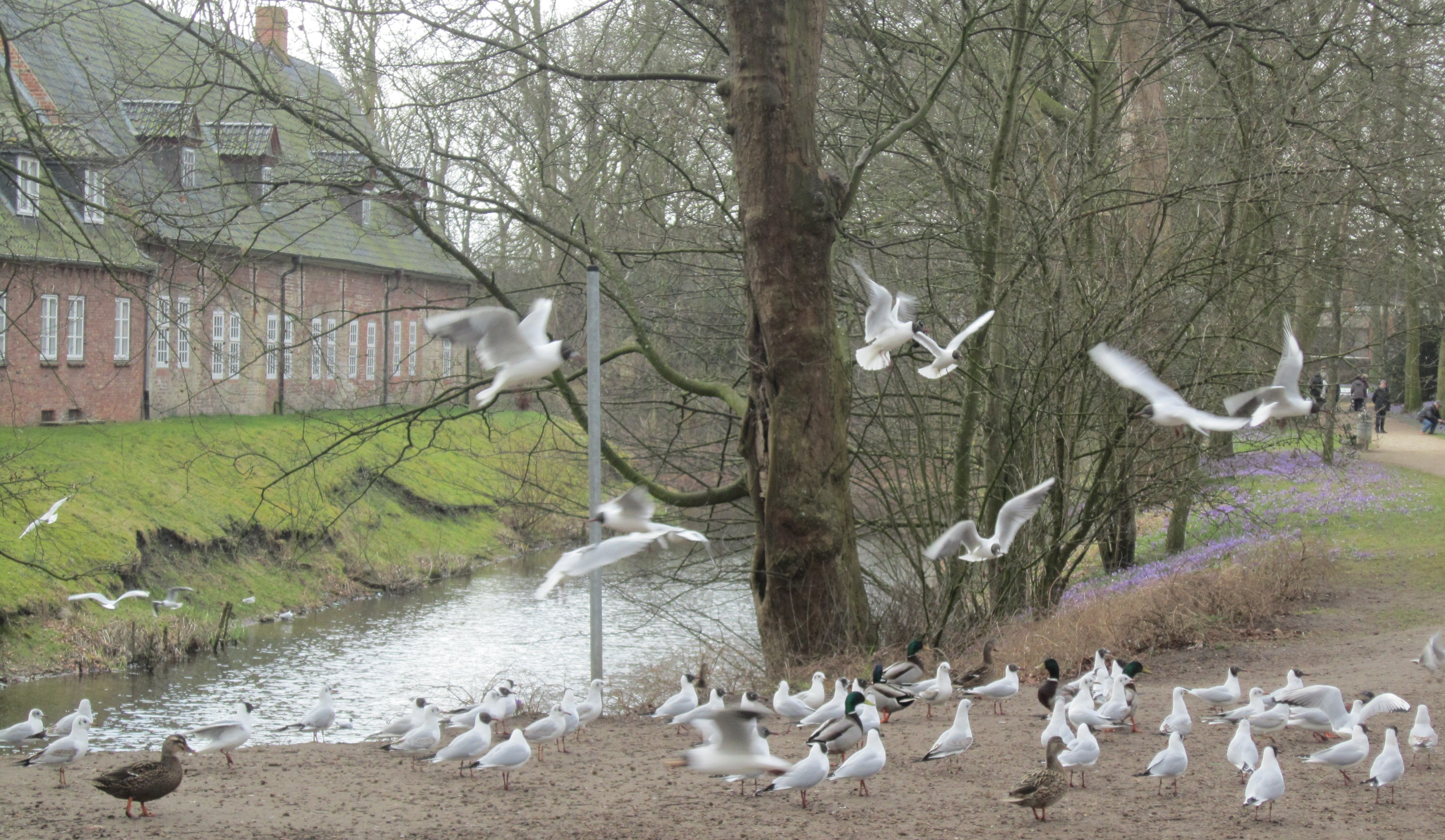
Near the North Sea: seagulls mingle with the ducks in the moat between the palace gardens and the palace

In 1994, the park was entered as a listed monument of Schleswig-Holstein.

On the castle island, in front of the eastern and western facades, a small formally designed ornamental garden was reintroduced in 2008. This Duchess's Garden represents a modern reconstruction of the early Baroque Garden parterres that were originally present in the 17th century.
