= Alfred Noyes =

English poet (1880–1958)

Alfred Noyes CBE
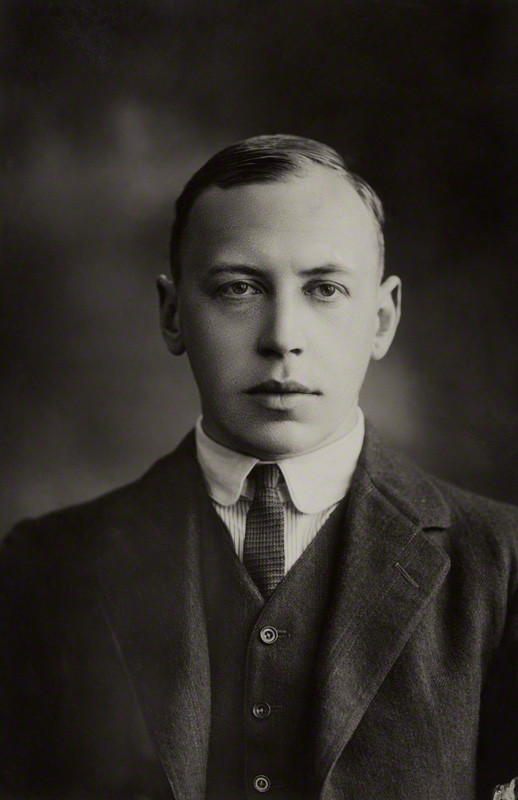
- 1922 portrait of Noyes
- Born: 16 September 1880; Wolverhampton, England
- Died: 25 June 1958 (aged 77); Isle of Wight, England
- Resting place: Totland
- Education: Exeter College, Oxford
- Occupation: Poet
- Spouse(s): Garnett Daniels (1907–1926); Mary Angela Mayne (1927–1958)
- Children: Hugh; Veronica; Margaret
- Writing career
- Period: 1902–1958
- Subject: English
- Notable works: "The Highwayman" "The Barrel-Organ"
- Notable awards: D.Litt., Yale University, 1913; CBE, 1918

Alfred Noyes CBE (16 September 1880 – 25 June 1958) was an English poet, short-story writer and playwright.

== Early years ==
Noyes was born in Wolverhampton, England the son of Alfred and Amelia Adams Noyes. When he was four, the family moved to Aberystwyth, Wales, where his father taught Latin and Greek. The Welsh coast and mountains were an inspiration to Noyes.

== Early career ==
In 1898, he left Aberystwyth for Exeter College, Oxford, where he distinguished himself at rowing, but failed to get his degree because he was meeting his publisher to arrange publication of his first volume of poems, The Loom of Years (1902), on a crucial day of his finals in 1903. On publication, The Loom of Years was lauded by W. B. Yeats and George Meredith. Noyes' poetry also proved popular with the book-buying public, and for the first two decades of his career his books sold well.

=== The Barrel-Organ and The Highwayman ===
Noyes published five more volumes of poetry from 1903 to 1913, among them The Flower of Old Japan (1903) and Poems (1904). Poems included "The Barrel-Organ". "The Highwayman" was first published in the August 1906 issue of Blackwood's Magazine, and included the following year in Forty Singing Seamen and Other Poems. In a nationwide poll conducted by the BBC in 1995 to find Britain's favourite poem, "The Highwayman" was voted the nation's 15th favourite poem. This poem was also the inspiration for name of the American folk music revival group, The Highwaymen.

=== Drake ===
Another major work in this phase of his career was Drake, a 200-page epic in blank verse about the Elizabethan naval commander Sir Francis Drake, which was published in two volumes (1906 and 1908). The poem shows the clear influence of Romantic poets such as Tennyson and Wordsworth, both in style and subject. Both volumes of Drake were the subjects of articles in The Times Literary Supplement.

=== Sherwood ===
Noyes' only full-length play, Sherwood, was published in 1911; it was reissued in 1926, with alterations, as Robin Hood. One of his most popular poems, "A Song of Sherwood", also dates from 1911. Eventually, one of the more popular ballads dating from this period, "Bacchus and the Pirates", was set to music for two voices and piano by Michael Brough, and first performed at the Swaledale Festival in 2012.

== Views on literature ==
Noyes stated that Geoffrey Chaucer, William Shakespeare, John Milton, Samuel Johnson and Alfred, Lord Tennyson were the greatest writers in the English language. Noyes modelled his poetry after Tennyson's, and published a critical study of Tennyson in 1932. Noyes also admired the work of William Morris; his study of that writer was published in 1908. It was praised by Andrew Lang and later by C. S. Lewis.

By contrast, Noyes disliked most works of literary modernism. Noyes disdained the poetry of T. S. Eliot, regarding it as abstruse and pretentious. Noyes expressed contempt for Arnold Bennett, H. L. Mencken and Marcel Proust in his book The Edge of the Abyss, describing their works as salacious, irreligious and harmful to society as a whole. Noyes also had a special hatred for the work of James Joyce, calling it "filth". Noyes decried Joyce's Ulysses, claiming that the novel was obscure and gratuitously vulgar. In a 1922 article for the Sunday Chronicle, Noyes called Ulysses "Literary Bolshevism" and "the foulest book that has ever found its way into print." When Lord Birkenhead died in 1930, Noyes, in collaboration with Lord Darling, obtained the withdrawal of a copy of Ulysses (at that time, banned in the UK) from the auction sale of Birkenhead's effects.

== First marriage and America ==
In 1907, Noyes married Garnett Daniels, youngest daughter of US Army Colonel Byron G. Daniels, a Civil War veteran who was for some years U.S. Consul at Hull. Noyes first visited America in February 1913, partly to lecture on world peace and disarmament and partly to satisfy his wife's desire that he should gather fresh experiences in her homeland. His first lecture tour lasted six weeks, extending as far west as Chicago. It proved so successful that he decided to make a second trip to the US in October and to stay six months. In this trip, he visited the principal American universities, including Princeton, where the impression he made on the faculty and undergraduates was so favourable that in February 1914 he was asked to join the staff as a visiting professor, lecturing on modern English literature from February to June. He accepted, and for the next nine years he and his wife divided their year between England and the US. At Princeton, Noyes' students included F. Scott Fitzgerald, Edmund Wilson and John Peale Bishop. He resigned his professorship in 1923, but continued to travel and lecture throughout the United States for the rest of his life. Noyes' work proved to be popular in the United States. His writings were praised by the American reviewers Thomas Bailey Aldrich and William Lyon Phelps, and his poems were reprinted in numerous US newspapers and magazines. His wife died in 1926 at Saint-Jean-de-Luz, France, where she and Noyes were staying with friends.

== War ==
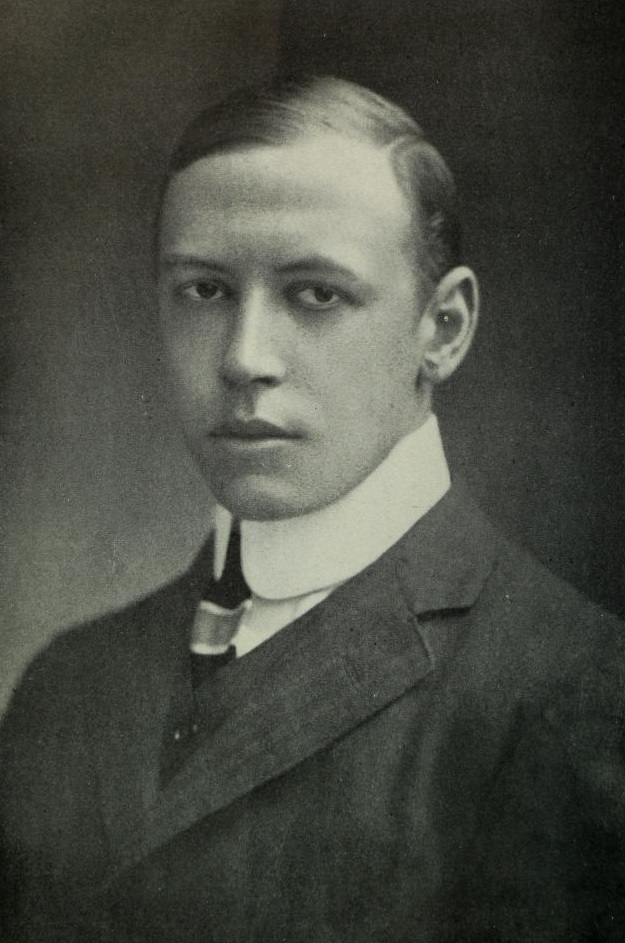
Portrait of Alfred Noyes, in The World's Work, 1913

Noyes is often portrayed by hostile critics as a militarist and jingoist. Actually, he was a pacifist who hated war and lectured against it, but felt that, when threatened by an aggressive and unreasoning enemy, a nation could not but fight. On this principle, he opposed the Boer War, but supported the Allies in both the World Wars. In 1913, when it seemed that war might yet be avoided, he published a long anti-war poem called The Wine Press. One American reviewer wrote that Noyes was "inspired by a fervent hatred of war and all that war means", and had used "all the resources of his varied art" to depict its "ultimate horror". The poet and critic Helen Bullis found Noyes' "anti-militarist" poem "remarkable", "passionate and inspiring", but, in its "unsparing realism", lacking in "the large vision, which sees the ultimate truth rather than the immediate details". In her view, Noyes failed to address the "vital questions" raised, for example, by William James' observation that for modern man, "War is the strong life; it is life in extremis", or by Shakespeare's invocation in The Two Noble Kinsmen of war as the "great corrector" that heals and cures "sick" times. Bullis, a Freudian (unlike Noyes, for whom psychoanalysis was a pseudo-science), thought war had deeper roots than Noyes acknowledged. She saw looming "the great figures of the Fates back of the conflict, while Mr Noyes sees only the 'five men in black tail-coats' whose cold statecraft is responsible for it". In 1915, Upton Sinclair included some striking passages from The Wine Press in his anthology of the literature of social protest, The Cry for Justice.

During World War I, Noyes was debarred by defective eyesight from serving at the front. Instead, from 1916, he did his military service on attachment to the Foreign Office, where he worked with John Buchan on propaganda. He also did his patriotic chore as a literary figure, writing morale-boosting short stories and exhortatory odes and lyrics recalling England's military past and asserting the morality of her cause. These works are now forgotten, apart from two ghost stories, "The Lusitania Waits" and "The Log of the Evening Star", which are still occasionally reprinted in collections of tales of the uncanny. "The Lusitania Waits" is a ghost revenge story based on the sinking of the Lusitania by a German submarine in 1915 – although the tale hinges on an erroneous claim that the submarine crew had been awarded the Goetz medal for sinking the ship.

He aided pacifist causes financially, by contributing the whimsical poem A Spell for a Fairy to Princess Mary's Gift Book (c. 1915). The illustrations for this, by C.H.Shepperson, formed the templates for the Cottingley Fairies, controversially accepted, for instance by Arthur Conan Doyle as genuine evidence for psychic phenomena.

During World War II, Noyes wrote the same kind of patriotic poems, but he also wrote a much longer and more considered work, If Judgement Comes, in which Hitler stands accused before the tribunal of history. It was first published separately (1941) and then in the collection, Shadows on the Down and Other Poems (1945). The only fiction Noyes published in World War II was The Last Man (1940), a science fiction novel whose message could hardly be more anti-war. In the first chapter, a global conflict wipes out almost the entire human race.

Noyes' best-known anti-war poem, "The Victory Ball" (aka "A Victory Dance"), was first published in The Saturday Evening Post in 1920. He wrote it after attending a ball held in London soon after the Armistice, where he found himself wondering what the ghosts of the soldiers who had died in the war would say if they could observe the thoughtless frivolity of the dancers. The message of the poem lies in the line, "Under the dancing feet are the graves." A brief passage about a girl "fresh from school" who "begs for a dose of the best cocaine" was replaced by something innocuous in the Post version, but reinstated when the poem appeared in a collection of Noyes' verse. "The Victory Ball" was turned into a symphonic poem by Ernest Schelling and into a ballet by Benjamin Zemach. In 1966, at the height of the Vietnam War, Congressman H. R. Gross, indignant at a White House dinner dance that went on until 3 a.m. while American soldiers were giving their lives, inserted Noyes' poem in the Congressional Record as bearing "directly on the subject matter in hand".

== Middle years ==
In 1918, Noyes' short story collection, Walking Shadows: Sea Tales and Others, came out. It included both "The Lusitania Waits" and "The Log of the Evening Star". In 1924 Noyes published another collection, The Hidden Player, which included a novella, Beyond the Desert: A Tale of Death Valley, already published separately in America in 1920.

For the Pageant of Empire at the 1924 British Empire Exhibition, Noyes wrote a series of poems set to music by Sir Edward Elgar and known as Pageant of Empire. Among these poems was Shakespeare's Kingdom.

In 1929, Noyes published the first of his three novels, The Return of the Scare-Crow (US title: The Sun Cure). A light-hearted story combining adventure, satire and comedy, it is about an earnest young clergyman named Basil. During a walk on the South Downs, Basil comes across a ruined cottage, where he decides to try sunbathing naked, as recommended by a friend. His clothes vanish, and he has to battle his way back to them through a series of mental hazards – all the latest intellectual fads and follies – and ends up rather less naïve than before.

== Second marriage and Catholicism ==
In 1927, the year after his first wife's death, Noyes married Mary Angela née Mayne (1889–1976), widow of Lieutenant Richard Shireburn Weld-Blundell, a member of the old recusant Catholic Weld-Blundell family, who had been killed in World War I. Later that year, Noyes himself converted to Catholicism. He gives an account of his conversion in his autobiography, Two Worlds for Memory (1953), but sets forth the more intellectual steps by which he was led from agnosticism to the Catholic faith in The Unknown God (1934), a widely read work of Christian apologetics which has been described as "the spiritual biography of a generation". In 1929, Noyes and Mary Angela settled at Lisle Combe, on the Undercliff near Ventnor, Isle of Wight. They had three children: Hugh (1929–2000), Veronica and Margaret. Noyes' younger daughter married Michael Nolan (later Lord Nolan) in 1953.

== The Torch-Bearers ==
Noyes' ambitious epic verse trilogy The Torch-Bearers – comprising Watchers of the Sky (1922), The Book of Earth (1925) and The Last Voyage (1930) – deals with the history of science. In the "Prefatory Note" to Watchers of the Sky, Noyes expresses his purpose in writing the trilogy:

This volume, while it is complete in itself, is also the first of a trilogy, the scope of which is suggested in the prologue. The story of scientific discovery has its own epic unity – a unity of purpose and endeavour – the single torch passing from hand to hand through the centuries; and the great moments of science when, after long labour, the pioneers saw their accumulated facts falling into a significant order – sometimes in the form of a law that revolutionised the whole world of thought – have an intense human interest, and belong essentially to the creative imagination of poetry. It is with these moments that my poem is chiefly concerned, not with any impossible attempt to cover the whole field or to make a new poetic system, after the Lucretian model, out of modern science.

=== Watchers of the Sky ===
Noyes adds that the theme of the trilogy had long been in his mind, but the first volume, dealing with Watchers of the Sky, began to take definite shape only on the night of 1/2 November 1917, when the 100-inch reflecting telescope at Mount Wilson Observatory was first tested by starlight. George Ellery Hale, the man who conceived and founded the observatory, had invited Noyes, who was then in California, to be his guest on this momentous occasion, and the prologue, subtitled "The Observatory", gives Noyes' detailed description of that "unforgettable...night". In his review of Watchers of the Sky, the scholar and historian of science Frederick E. Brasch writes that Noyes' "journey up to the mountain's top, the observatory, the monastery, telescopes and mirrors, clockwork, switchboard, the lighted city below, planets and stars, atoms and electrons all are woven into...beautiful narrative poetry. It seems almost incredible that technical terms and concepts could lend themselves for that purpose."

After the prologue come seven long poems, each of which depicts salient episodes in the career of a major scientist, so as to bring out both the "intensely human drama" ("Prefatory Note") of his life and his contribution to astronomy. Noyes' seven scientists are Nicolaus Copernicus, Tycho Brahe, Johannes Kepler, Galileo Galilei, Isaac Newton, and William and John Herschel – though due mention is also made of the contribution of Caroline Herschel, sister to William and aunt to John. In the epilogue, Noyes meditates once more upon the mountain in the morning, before bringing his narrative to a close in the form of a prayer.

In his review, Frederick E. Brasch writes that Noyes' "knowledge of the science of astronomy and its history...seems remarkable in one who is so entirely unrelated to the work of an observatory". Watchers of the Sky, he adds, will no doubt appeal to the layman "for its beauty and the music of its narrative verse, broken and interspersed with epic poetry. But it remains for the astronomer and other scholars in science to enjoy it to the fullness which is adequate to Noyes' ability as a poet."

=== The Book of Earth ===
The Book of Earth is the second volume in the trilogy. In eight sections framed by a meditative prologue and epilogue, it follows the discoveries of scientists in their struggles to solve the mysteries of the earth, of life forms, and of human origins. Starting in ancient Greece with Pythagoras and Aristotle, it then moves to the Middle East for Al-Farabi and Avicenna. The scene then shifts successively to Italy for Leonardo da Vinci, France for Jean-Étienne Guettard, Sweden for Carl Linnaeus, France again for Georges-Louis Leclerc, Comte de Buffon, Jean Baptiste Lamarck, Antoine Lavoisier, and Georges Cuvier, and then Germany for Johann Wolfgang von Goethe, before ending in England with Charles Darwin. Reviewing The Book of Earth for Nature, F. S. Marvin wrote, "It deals with a much more difficult subject from the point of view of poetic presentation, namely biology, or rather geology as a preface to zoology and evolution as crowning geology." Nevertheless, it does not "belie the...expectations" raised by its predecessor. By contrast, Edgell Rickword in the September 1925 issue of The Calendar of Modern Letters gave a negative review of The Book of Earth. Rickword stated: "If ‘science’ had really meant anything, poetically, to Mr. Noyes, it would have altered his universe; would have created metaphors. As it is, he sails his pretentious kite with rags of literature and superstition in its tail." Rickword's article on Noyes was reprinted in the book Towards Standards of Criticism by the literary critic F. R. Leavis in 1933. In his introduction to that book, Leavis described Noyes' poetry as "intrinsically uninteresting work". Because of Rickword and Leavis' prominence as literary critics, Noyes' literary reputation began to decline in the 1920s.

=== The Last Voyage ===
Before Noyes had begun proper work on the final volume in the trilogy, The Last Voyage, two events occurred which were to influence it greatly: his first wife's death and his conversion to Roman Catholicism. Death is a major theme in The Last Voyage, as its very title suggests. The tone, more sombre than that of its predecessors, is also more religious – though religion was hardly absent from the earlier volumes – and, as might be expected, more specifically Catholic.

The Last Voyage begins at night in mid-Atlantic, where an ocean liner, "a great ship like a lighted city", is battling through a raging storm. A little girl is mortally ill. The ship's surgeon prepares to operate, but with little hope of success, for the case is complicated and he is no specialist. Luckily, the captain knows from the Wireless news that a top specialist from Johns Hopkins Hospital is on another liner 400 miles away – within wireless range. The ship's surgeon will be able to consult him, and stay in touch with him throughout the operation. Suddenly, the little girl's chances of survival are much improved. In a manner of speaking, all the scientific discoveries and inventions of the past are being brought to bear in the attempt to save her life. When the poet asks a casually-met fellow-passenger, "You think they'll save her?" the stranger replies, "They may save her", and then adds enigmatically, "But who are They?"

Reflecting, the poet realises that They are all the seekers and discoverers of scientific truths through the ages – people like William Harvey, Louis Pasteur and Joseph Lister in the field of medicine or Michael Faraday, James Clerk Maxwell and Heinrich Hertz in the development of the wireless. Nevertheless, despite the united efforts of all, the little girl dies, and in the darkness of that loss the poet finds that only in Faith can a flicker of light be found. Science cannot defeat death in the long run, and sometimes, as in the little girl's case, not even in the short run, but if "Love, not Death" is the ultimate reality, death will not have the final word. Of course, the "last voyage" of the title is not just that of the little girl or of Noyes' second wife – though there are lyrics mourning her in Section XIII and another in the Dedication at the end – but of everyman and everywoman.

F. S. Marvin, who reviewed all three volumes of The Torch-Bearers for Nature, wrote that "the third volume is certainly the best from the artistic point of view. It contains one well-conceived and highly interesting incident, around which the author's pictures of the past and incidental lyrics are effectively grouped, and it leads up to a full and eloquent exposition of the religious synthesis with which the history of science inspires him."

== The Last Man ==
In 1940 Noyes published a science fiction novel, The Last Man (US title: No Other Man), in which the human race is almost wiped out by a powerful death ray capable of killing everyone, friend or foe, unless they are in a steel chamber deep under the surface of the sea. The inventor's chief assistant unscrupulously sells the plans to the leading nations of the world, who declare they will use the ray only as a "last resort". When events spiral out of control, however, they all activate it, killing everyone living on the earth.

When the death ray strikes, a 29-year-old Englishman named Mark Adams is trapped in a sunken submarine. Managing to escape, he finds himself the only survivor in Britain. He travels to Paris in the hope of finding another survivor. There he discovers a clue which gives him hope. His search leads him to Italy, where he finally finds the other survivor, an American girl named Evelyn Hamilton. At the time when the death ray struck, she was in a diving bell deep below the surface of the Mediterranean, where, under the guidance of Mardok, an immensely wealthy magnate and scientific genius, she was engaged in photographing the floor of the sea. Her companion turns out to be the villain of the story. Knowing the power of the ray, for whose development he had been largely responsible, he had made sure that, at the time of its activation, he was safely out of its reach, along with an attractive young woman with whom he could later begin the repopulation of the planet. Evelyn, however, finds him repulsive, and the arrival of the upstanding, handsome young Englishman further upsets Mardok's plan. In the ensuing competition between the two men for the girl, Mark Adams' surname is a clear hint at which of the two is better fitted to be Adam to Evelyn's Eve. The two young people fall in love, but Mardok kidnaps Evelyn. After her escape and Mardok's death, the novel concludes with the young couple's discovery of some other survivors at Assisi.

For Charles Holland, reviewing the novel in the 1940s, Noyes' combination of "such elements of human interest as apologetics, art, travel and a captivating love story" mean that the reader of The Last Man is assured of both "an intellectual treat and real entertainment". Eric Atlas, writing in an early science fiction fanzine, found the novel, despite some flaws, "well worth the reading – perhaps twice". The philosophico-religious theme, he wrote, "detracts in no way from the forceful characterizations...of Mark and Evelyn". Besides, most of the novel is set "in Italy, where Noyes' descriptive powers as a poet come to the fore". The Last Man seems to be the novel which introduced the idea of a doomsday weapon. It is thought to have been among the influences on George Orwell's Nineteen Eighty-Four.

== Later years ==
In 1940, Noyes returned to North America, where he lectured and advocated the British war position. The following year, he gave the Josiah Wood lectures at Mount Allison University, New Brunswick, Canada. Titled The Edge of the Abyss, they were first published in Canada in 1942 and then, in a revised version, in the United States the same year and in Britain two years later. In The Edge of the Abyss, Noyes ponders the future of the world, attacking totalitarianism, bureaucracy, the pervasive power of the state, and the collapse of moral standards. George Orwell reviewed the book for The Observer and, like The Last Man, it is considered a probable influence on Nineteen Eighty-Four.

In his review, Orwell wrote that The Edge of the Abyss "raises a real problem," paraphrasing Noyes' premise as a question of "decay in the belief in absolute good and evil," with the result that the "rules of behaviour on which any stable society has to rest are dissolving" and "even the prudential reasons for common decency are being forgotten." Indeed, in Orwell's view, Noyes "probably even underemphasises the harm done to ordinary common sense by the cult of 'realism', with its inherent tendency to assume that the dishonest course is always the profitable one." Orwell, however, finds Noyes' suggested remedy, a return to Christianity, "doubtful, even from the point of view of practicality." He agrees that the "problem of our time is to restore the sense of absolute right and wrong" but this is at a time when its foundation, a belief in personal immortality, has been "destroyed." While Orwell names "faith" as what would be needed in this restoration, he also notes that focusing on Christian faith as Noyes does would exclude wide swaths of Asia and imply a "good life" could only be lived on the "fringes of the Atlantic." Orwell concludes Noyes "is probably wrong in imagining that the Christian faith, as it existed in the past, can be restored even in Europe." Orwell does not expound further on what his broader concept of "faith" entails.

An anonymous review of The Edge of the Abyss in the American magazine Free World was more critical. The review focuses on Noyes' claim that literary Modernism is a symptom of the problems of the world, and concluded: "The point is debatable, the argument high-pitched and inconclusive, and the remedies proposed vague and unsatisfactory."

Noyes remained in retirement in California for some years. In 1943, he published The Secret of Pooduck Island, a children's story set off the coast of Maine. It features a family of squirrels threatened by natural enemies (skunks, weasels) and humans, the ghost of a Native American man who suffered a terrible sorrow in the colonial era, and a teenage boy who has ambitions to be an artist and who is able to help both the squirrels and the ghost. It is, however, far more profound and terrible than the lighthearted accounts of animal behaviour seem on the surface to indicate; a mysterious voice keeps whispering words of mystery to the artist Solo, and most of the characters turn out to be incarnations of the various follies and stupidities of mankind: the fierce lonely boy-artist (who is nearly locked up as insane by the petty spiteful villagers) and the pudgy but wise priest, as well as the solemn ghost of Squando, being the only exceptions against which the others are contrasted. The entire "secret" of Pooduck Island consists in the gleams of the supernatural that blaze through the canopy of the material world, like a glimpse of the ocean through an arch in the woods that Solo names the "Eye" of the island. The mysterious Voice, who is hinted to be Glooskap himself, appears indirectly as an invisible model for a portrait of the Squirrel family, who think they are seated on a stump: but the picture records him.

In 1949, Noyes returned to his home on the Isle of Wight. As a result of increasing blindness, he dictated all his subsequent works. In 1952 he brought out another book for children, Daddy Fell into the Pond and Other Poems. The title poem has remained a firm favourite with children ever since. In 2005, it was one of the few poems that featured in both of two major anthologies of poetry for children published that year, one edited by Caroline Kennedy, the other by Elise Paschen.

In 1955, Noyes published the satirical fantasy novel The Devil Takes A Holiday, in which the Devil, in the guise of Mr Lucius Balliol, an international financier, comes to Santa Barbara, California, for a pleasant little holiday. He finds however, that his work is being so efficiently performed by humankind that he has become redundant. The unwonted soul-searching this leads him to is not only painful but also – owing to a tragicomic twist at the end – ultimately futile. Brian Stableford has described The Devil Takes A Holiday as "comic affair" and "an interesting example of English "Literary Satanism.""

Noyes' last book of poetry, A Letter to Lucian and Other Poems, came out in 1956, two years before his death by polio.

== The Accusing Ghost ==
In 1957, Noyes published his last book, The Accusing Ghost, or Justice for Casement (US title: The Accusing Ghost of Roger Casement). In 1916, the renowned human rights campaigner Roger Casement was hanged for his involvement in the Irish Nationalist revolt in Dublin known as the Easter Rising. To forestall calls for clemency, the British authorities showed public figures and known sympathizers selected pages from some of Casement's diaries – known as the Black Diaries – that exposed him as a promiscuous homosexual. As a consequence the expected protests and petitions for Casement's reprieve failed to materialise.

Among those who read these extracts was Noyes, who was then working in the News Department of the Foreign Office and who described the pages as a "foul record" of "the lowest depths that human degradation has ever touched". Later that year in Philadelphia, when Noyes was about to give a lecture on the English poets, he was confronted by Casement's sister, Nina, who denounced him as a "blackguardly scoundrel" and cried, "Your countrymen hanged my brother Roger Casement."

Worse was to come. After Casement's death, the British authorities held the diaries in conditions of extraordinary secrecy, arousing strong suspicions among Casement's supporters that they were forged. In 1936, there appeared a book by an American doctor, William J. Maloney, called The Forged Casement Diaries. After reading it, W. B. Yeats wrote a protest poem, "Roger Casement", which was published with great prominence in The Irish Press. In the fifth stanza of the poem, Yeats named Alfred Noyes and called on him to desert the side of the forger and perjurer. Noyes immediately responded with a letter to The Irish Press in which he explained why he had assumed the diaries were authentic, confessed he might have been misled, and called for the setting up of a committee to examine the original documents and settle the matter. In response to what he called Noyes' "noble" letter, Yeats amended his poem, removing Noyes' name.

Over twenty years later, Casement's diaries were still being held in the same conditions of secrecy. In 1957, therefore, Noyes published The Accusing Ghost, or Justice for Casement, a stinging rebuke of British policy in which, making full amends for his previous harsh judgement, he argued that Casement had indeed been the victim of a British Intelligence plot.

In 2002, a forensic examination of the Black Diaries concluded that they were authentic.

== Death ==
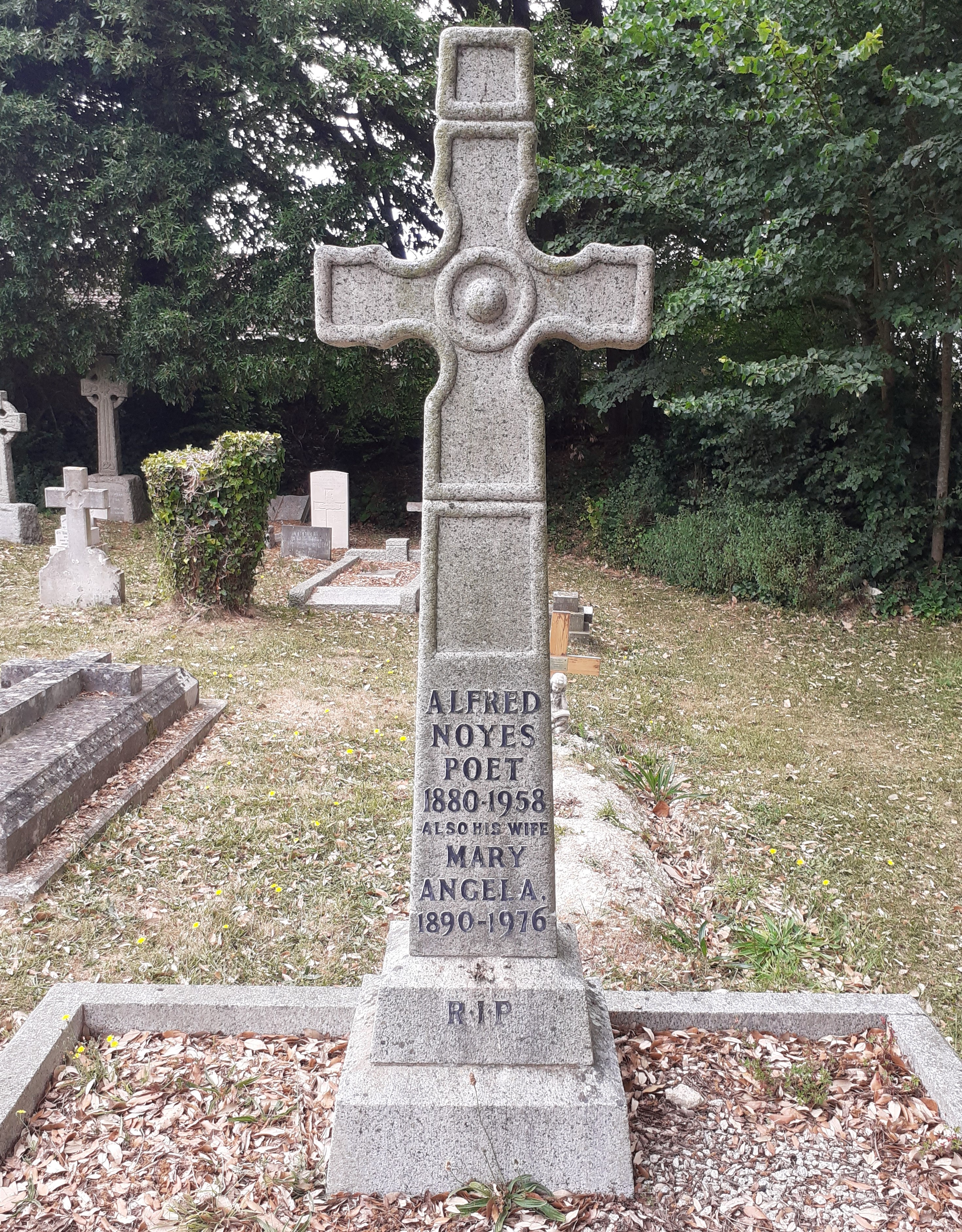
The grave of Noyes and his wife

Noyes' last poem, Ballade of the Breaking Shell, was written in May 1958, one month before his death. He died at the age of 77, and is buried in the Roman Catholic cemetery at Totland, Isle of Wight.

== Works ==
=== Poetry ===
- The Loom of Years (1902)
- The Flower of Old Japan (1903)
- The Forest of Wild Thyme (1905)
- The Highwayman (1906)
- Drake (1906–08)
- Forty Singing Seamen and Other Poems (1907)
- The Golden Hynde (1908)
- Tales of the Mermaid Tavern (1913)
- Watchers of the Sky (1922)
- Songs of Shadow-of-a-Leaf (1924)
- The Book of Earth (1925)
- The Last Voyage (1930)
- The Torch-bearers (1937)(the three books now combined as a single work)
- Shadows on the Down (1941)
- Collected Poems (1950)
- Daddy Fell into the Pond (1952)
- A Letter to Lucian (1956)

=== Other works ===
- The Thames in Literature pp. 123–27, July 1907, The Bookman
- William Morris (1908) Biography.
- Rada (1914) Drama.
- Walking Shadows (1918) Short Stories.
- The Hidden Player (1924) Short Stories.
- Some Aspects of Modern Poetry (1924) Criticism.
- The Opalescent Parrot (1929) Criticism.
- The Return of the Scare-Crow (The Sun Cure in America) (1929) Novel.
- The Unknown God (1934) Intellectual Autobiography.
- Orchard's Bay (1936) Essays.
- Voltaire (1936) Biography
- The Last Man (1940) Novel.
- Pageant of Letters (1940) Criticism.
- The Secret of Pooduck Island (1943) Children's story.
- Two Worlds for Memory (1953) Autobiography.
- The Devil Takes A Holiday (1955) Novel.
- The Accusing Ghost (1957)

== Films based on Noyes' works ==
- The Highwayman
- Dick Turpin's Ride

== Songs based on Noyes' works ==
- Eight songs set by to music by Elgar in the 1924 Pageant of Empire
- Bacchus and the Pirates (Michael Brough)
- "Everywhere" (1987 music video by Fleetwood Mac)
- Madrigals Book XI Carmina Silvicola (Clive Strutt)
- The Highwayman by Phil Ochs
- Let My Love Be Heard by Jake Runestad, setting of Noyes’ A Prayer
- The Highwayman by Loreena McKennitt
- The River of Stars: A Legend of Niagara (1917; music by Clarence Bawden)
