= Jonathan Plowright =

English classical pianist (born 1959)

Jonathan Plowright (born 1959) is an English classical pianist.

== Life and career ==
Plowright was born in Yorkshire, England. He was educated at Stonyhurst College, in Lancashire. He was a gold medallist at the Royal Academy of Music, London, where his professor was Alexander Kelly. He was also a recipient of a Fulbright Scholarship to study at the Peabody Conservatory in Baltimore with Julio Esteban.

Plowright won the Baltimore Symphony Orchestra Award in 1984 and the European Piano Competition in 1989. His USA debut was at Carnegie Hall in 1984. His UK debut followed in 1985, at Wigmore Hall. Plowright has performed worldwide as recitalist, appeared with leading orchestras and ensembles, made many commercial recordings and appeared on radio and TV broadcasts.

He champions neglected music from Polish Romantic composers, including Zygmunt Stojowski, Ignacy Jan Paderewski Juliusz Zarębski, Władysław Żeleński, Ludomir Różycki, Ignaz Friedman and Henryk Melcer-Szczawiński, which he has recorded for Hyperion Records and Warner Classics.

He gave the world premiere performance of Constant Lambert's Piano Concerto, and made world premiere recordings of the transcriptions of JS Bach by Walter Morse Rummel, the 'Bach Book for Harriet', the collaborative suite Homage to Paderewski and the "Symphonic Rhapsody" by Stojowski.

Between 2012 and 2017 Plowright recorded the complete solo piano works of Johannes Brahms for BIS Records.

He taught part-time at the Royal Conservatoire of Scotland from 2007 until 2020. He offers masterclasses, consultation lessons and prize adjudications.
