= Ernest Schelling =

American conductor (1876–1939)

Ernest Henry Schelling
- Schelling circa 1915

Conductor of the Baltimore Symphony Orchestra
- In office 1935–1937
- Preceded by: George Siemonn
- Succeeded by: Werner Janssen

Personal details
- Born: July 26, 1876 Belvidere, New Jersey
- Died: December 8, 1939 (aged 63) Manhattan, New York City
- Resting place: St. Elizabeth's Memorial Chapel, Tuxedo, New York
- Education: Conservatoire de Paris

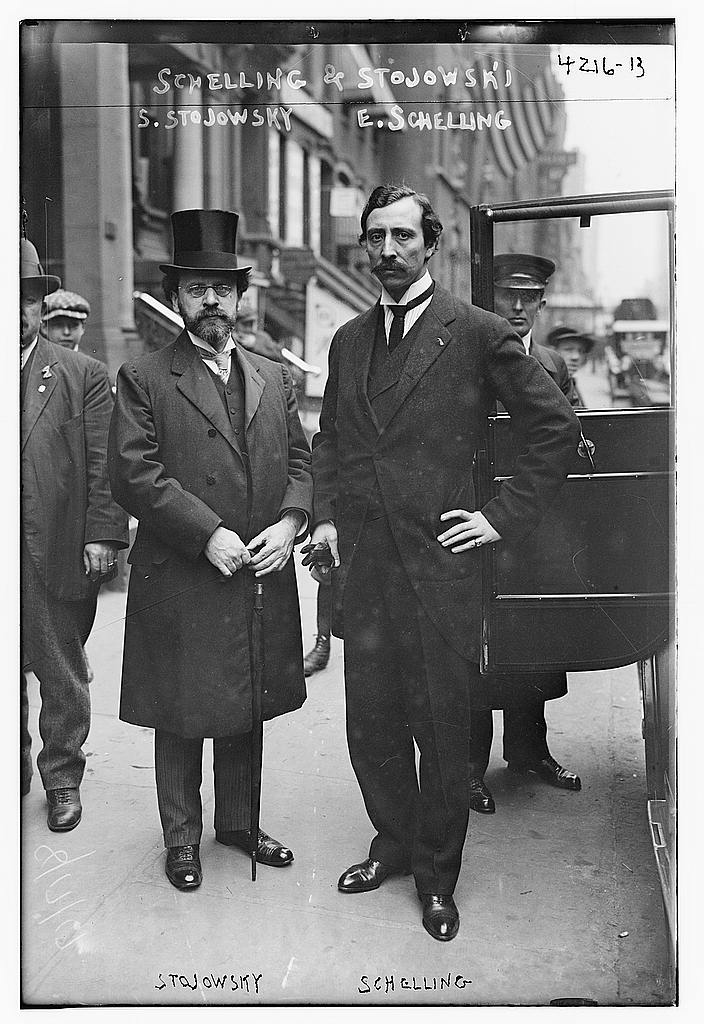
Zygmunt Stojowski and Ernest Schelling on May 18, 1917, for the funeral of Guillaume Stengel

Ernest Henry Schelling (July 26, 1876 – December 8, 1939) was an American pianist, composer, and conductor, and music director. He was the conductor of the Baltimore Symphony Orchestra from 1935 to 1937.

== Biography ==
He was born in Belvidere, New Jersey, on July 26, 1876.

Schelling was a child prodigy. His first teacher was his father. He made his debut at the Academy of Music in Philadelphia, Pennsylvania, at age 4. At age 7, Schelling traveled to Europe to study. He was admitted to the Paris Conservatoire. While in Europe he worked with many great masters including Percy Goetschius, Hans Huber, Karl Heinrich Barth, Moritz Moszkowski and Theodor Leschetizky.

At the age of 20 in 1896, he began studying with Ignace Paderewski and was his only pupil for three years. He toured Europe and North and South America, gaining a reputation as a remarkable pianist.

His first wife was Lucie Howe Draper, whom he married on May 3, 1905, in Manhattan, New York City. She died on February 4, 1938, at their summer home in Lausanne, Switzerland.

He married his second wife, Helen Huntington "Peggy" Marshall, on August 11, 1939, when she was 21 and he was 63. She was the stepdaughter of the philanthropist Brooke Astor, and a niece of Vincent Astor.

He died of a cerebral embolism at his home in Manhattan, New York City, on December 8, 1939. His bride of four months was at his deathbed side.

== Composer ==
Schelling wrote numerous works for piano, orchestra and chamber groups which were often performed during his lifetime, but have since fallen from the repertoire. His most popular work was A Victory Ball, a symphonic poem for orchestra based on an anti-war poem by Alfred Noyes. Willem Mengelberg and the New York Philharmonic Orchestra made an early electrical recording of the music for the Victor Talking Machine Company.

== Honours ==
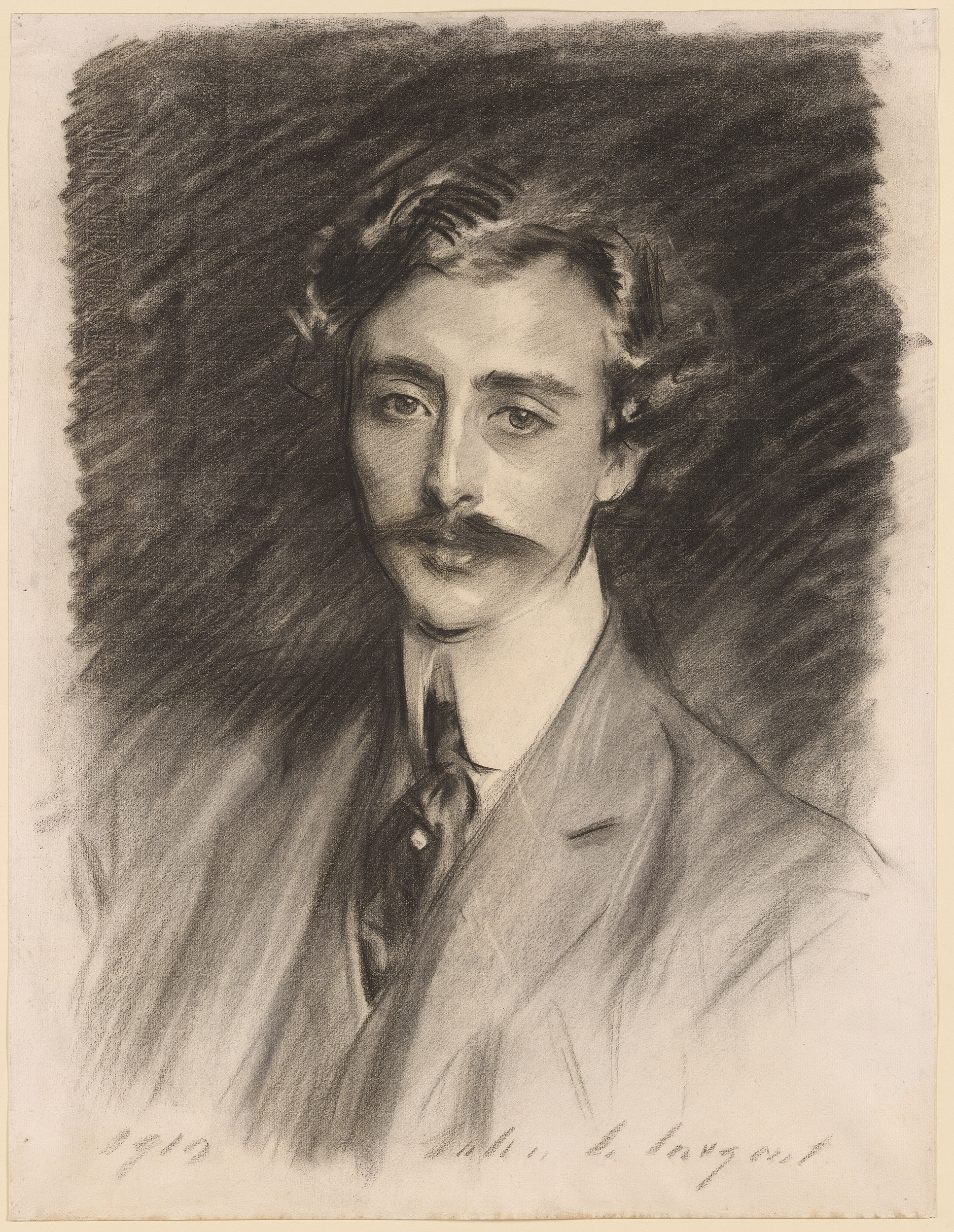
1910 Ernest Schelling by Sargent

He was elected an honorary member of Phi Mu Alpha Sinfonia fraternity, the national fraternity for men in music, in 1917 by the fraternity's Alpha chapter at the New England Conservatory of Music in Boston, Massachusetts.

Schelling was the first conductor of the Young People's Concerts of the New York Philharmonic. The first concert was held March 27, 1924. The concerts were designed to encourage the love of music in children. They combined the orchestra's performance with a lecture about one aspect or another of the orchestra or the music itself with a picture or demonstration, so that children were exposed to a variety of stimuli. The concerts were highly appreciated by children, as well as their parents. Schelling held these concerts in New York, and also took them on the road. Such cities as Philadelphia, London, Rotterdam and Los Angeles hosted them.
