= Zygmunt Stojowski =

Polish pianist and composer

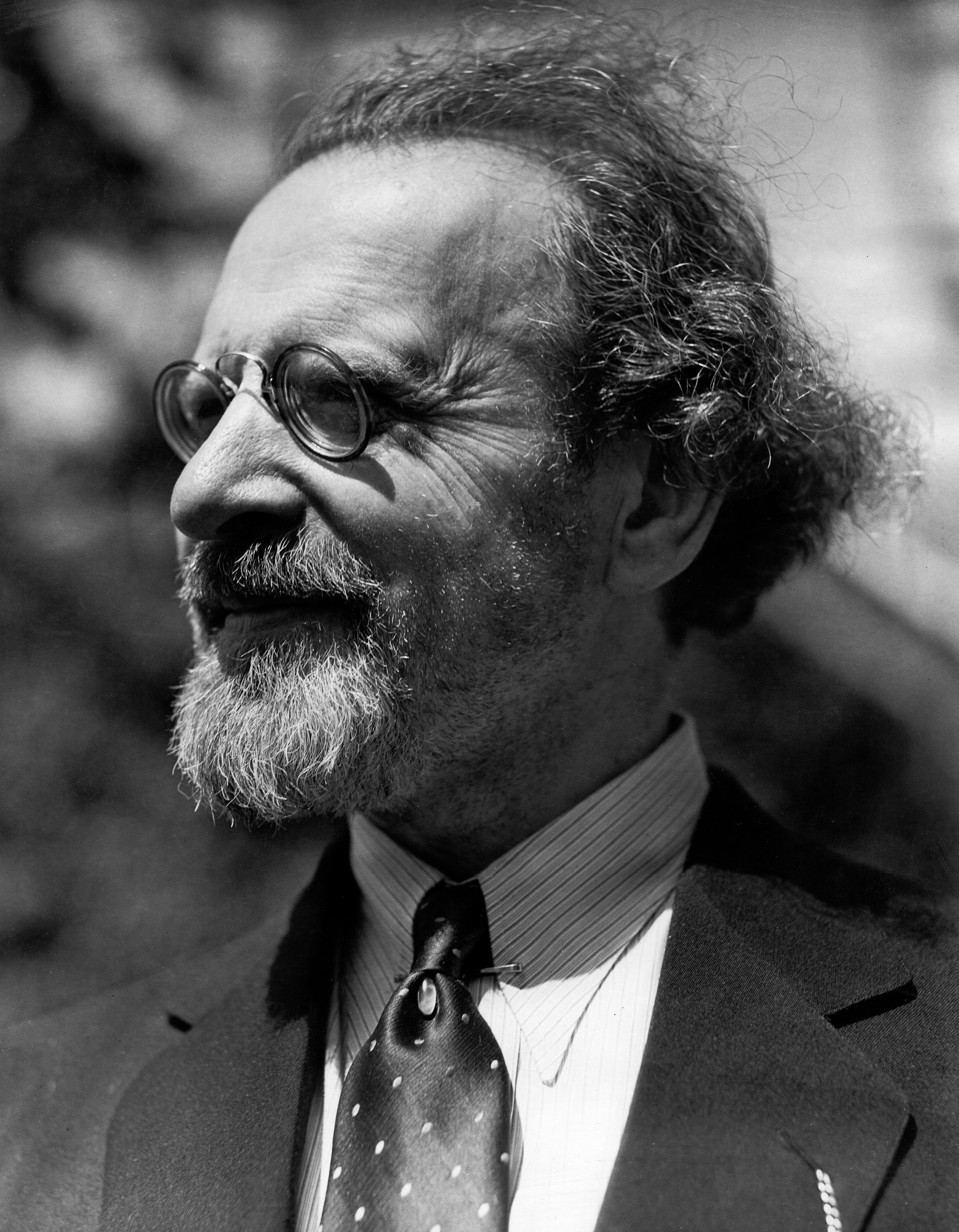
Zygmunt Stojowski.

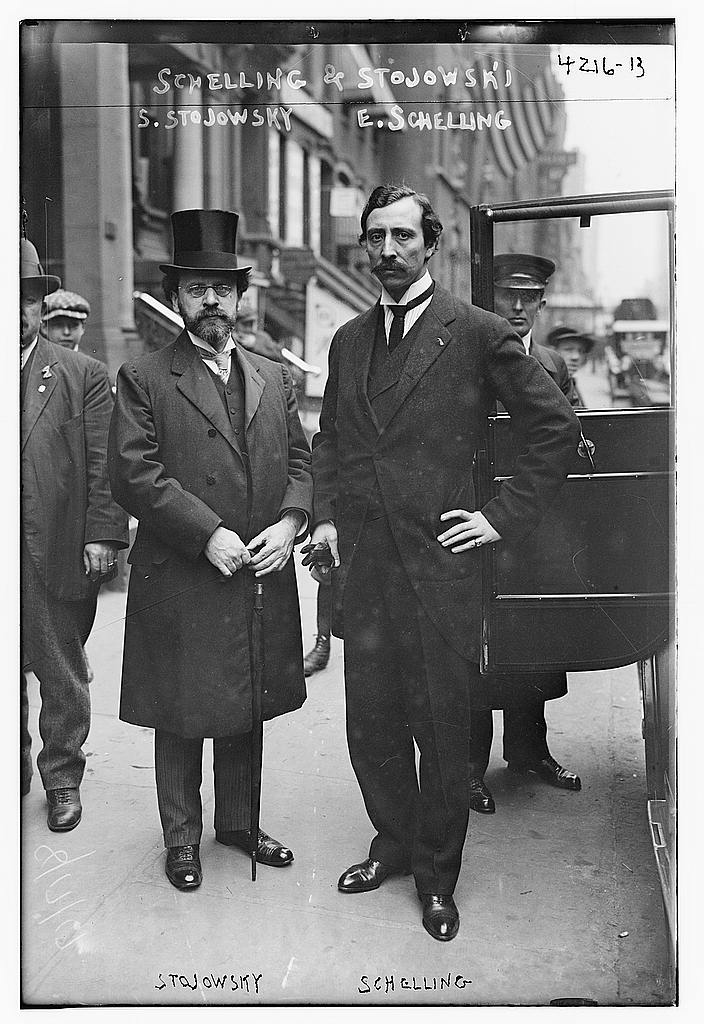
Zygmunt Stojowski and Ernest Schelling in 1917

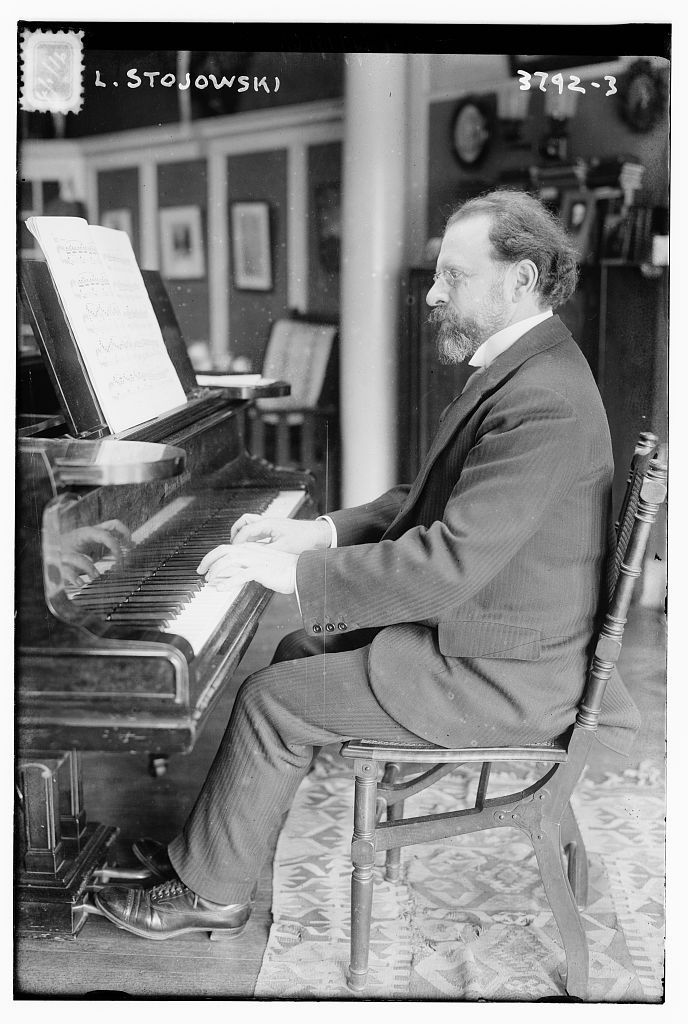
Stojowski in 1916 at his piano.

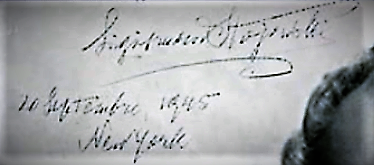
Signature as Sigismund Stojowski, 11 September 1945, New York

Zygmunt Denis Antoni Jordan de Stojowski (May 4, 1870 – November 5, 1946) was a Polish-American pianist and composer.

== Life ==
He was born on May 4, 1870, near the city of Kielce. Stojowski began his musical training with his mother, and with Polish composer Władysław Żeleński. In Kraków, as a seventeen-year-old student, he made his debut as a concert pianist performing Beethoven's Piano Concerto No. 3 with the local orchestra.

At the age of eighteen he moved to Paris and studied piano with Louis Diémer and composition with Léo Delibes. Two years later at the Paris Conservatoire, he would win first prizes in piano performance, counterpoint and fugue. According to Stojowski, however, in a December 1901 interview that appeared in a Warsaw magazine, the teachers who had the most profound influence on him as a musician were the Polish violinist-composer Wladyslaw Gorski and pianist-composer Ignacy Jan Paderewski.

Stojowski's music was found worthy enough to be included in the first concert of the Warsaw Philharmonic Orchestra, on 5 November 1901. His Symphony in D minor, Op. 21, which was featured in that first concert conducted by Emil Młynarski, had won first prize (1000 rubles) in a Paderewski Music Competition in Leipzig on 9 July 1898. Besides having his symphony performed at that first prestigious concert, Stojowski appeared as a recitalist in December and again as the soloist in Saint-Saëns' Piano Concerto No. 4 in January 1902.

In October 1905, Stojowski sailed on the SS Moltke to the USA on the invitation of Frank Damrosch, founder and director of the newly formed Institute of Musical Art, to head the institute's piano department; he was recommended for the position by pianist Harold Bauer and cellist Pablo Casals. New York became his home for the rest of his life.

The institute would later merge in 1924 with the Juilliard Graduate School to form the Juilliard School, where Stojowski would also teach during the summers of 1932 and 1940–46. In New York, he was acclaimed as a great composer, pianist and pedagogue, and had the distinction of being the first Polish composer to have an entire concert devoted to his music performed by the New York Philharmonic.

After six years of teaching at the Institute of Musical Art, Stojowski then headed the piano department at the Von Ende School of Music until 1917. Finally, due to the large number of students who wished to work with him, he opened his own 'Stojowski Studios' at his four-story brownstone home at 150 West 76th Street in Manhattan. Among Stojowski's pupils were Mischa Levitzki, Alfred Newman, Antonia Brico, Alice Marion Shaw, Arthur Loesser, and Oscar Levant.

Here, together with his Peruvian-born wife, Luisa Morales-Macedo, the pianist-composer not only taught until the end of the 1930s, but also raised what he called his "three best compositions": his sons, Alfred (1919–2019), Henry (1921–2018), and Ignace (1923–1984).

He died on November 5, 1946, in New York City.

== Recordings ==
- Piano Concertos 2001 by Jonathan Plowright for Hyperion Records
- Solo Pieces 2003 by Jonathan Plowright for Hyperion Records
