= List of shipwrecks in April 1846 =

The list of shipwrecks in April 1846 includes ships sunk, foundered, wrecked, grounded, or otherwise lost during April 1846.

== 1 April ==
List of shipwrecks: 1 April 1846
Ship	State	Description
Duchess of Northumberland	United Kingdom	The ship ran aground and was damaged in the Bay of Husum. She was on a voyage from Liverpool, Lancashire, to Husum, Duchy of Holstein. She was refloated.
Henry Shelton	United States	The ship ran aground at New Orleans, Louisiana. She was on a voyage from Pernambuco, Brazil, to New Orleans.
James Crawford	(United Kingdom of Great Britain and Ireland) Isle of Man	The sloop foundered off Crommick Point, Wigtownshire. She was on a voyage from Liverpool to Portrush, County Antrim.
Venus	United Kingdom	The schooner ran aground on the Barnard Sand, in the North Sea off the coast of Norfolk. She was on a voyage from London to Leith, Lothian. She was refloated and taken in to Great Yarmouth in a leaky condition.

== 2 April ==
List of shipwrecks: 2 April 1846
Ship	State	Description
Colombia	United Kingdom	The ship was wrecked near Bodie Island, Virginia, United States. Her crew were rescued. She was on a voyage from Liverpool to a port in Virginia.
Monarch	United Kingdom	The ship was driven ashore near Havana, Cuba. She was on a voyage from the Clyde to Saint Thomas, Virgin Islands and Havana. She was consequently condemned.
Tutelina	United Kingdom	The ship ran aground at Bridlington, Yorkshire.

== 3 April ==
List of shipwrecks: 3 April 1846
Ship	State	Description
Brian Boru	United Kingdom	The ship ran aground on the Horse Bank, in Liverpool Bay. She was on a voyage from Peel, Isle of Man, to Fleetwood and Liverpool, Lancashire.
Comet	United Kingdom	The schooner ran aground on the Barber Sand, in the North Sea off the coast of Norfolk. She was refloated but consequently foundered. Her crew were rescued by the St. Nicholas Lightship ( Trinity House). She was on a voyage from South Shields, County Durham, to Manningtree, Essex.
Frederick Wilhelm	Prussia	The galeas was driven ashore near Ringkøbing, Denmark. She was on a voyage from Newport, Wales, United Kingdom, to Stettin.
Industrie	Bremen	The galiot was in collision with Julie (France) 25 nautical miles (46 km) south-west of The Lizard, Cornwall, United Kingdom, and was abandoned. Her crew were rescued. She was on a voyage from Christiansand, Norway, to Bordeaux, Gironde, France.
Industry	United Kingdom	The schooner was discovered abandoned in the North Sea 7 nautical miles (13 km) east north east of Flamborough Head, Yorkshire, having been in collision with another vessel. She was taken in to Bridlington, Yorkshire, by the fishing boat Ino (United Kingdom).
Friedrich Wilhelm	Prussia	The ship was driven ashore near Ringkøbing, Denmark. She was on a voyage from Newport, Monmouthshire, United Kingdom, to Stettin. She was refloated on 9 April.
Henriette	United Kingdom	The schooner ran aground on Scroby Sands, Norfolk, and was wrecked. Her crew were rescued. She was on a voyage from Newport, Monmouthshire, to King's Lynn, Norfolk.
Laurentia	Sweden	The ship was wrecked on the Flemish Bank, in the North Sea with the loss of four of her crew. She was on a voyage from Arendal, Norway, to Trieste.
Waterwitch	United Kingdom	The paddle tug was in collision with the schooner Vintage (United Kingdom) and sank in the Firth of Forth off Inchcolm, Fife, with the loss of all six crew. Waterwitch was on a voyage from Alloa, Clackmannanshire, to Leith, Lothian.

== 4 April ==
List of shipwrecks: 4 April 1846
Ship	State	Description
Edmund	France	The ship foundered in the English Channel off Portland, Dorset, United Kingdom. Her crew were rescued by a Cowes pilot boat. She was on a voyage from Rouen, Seine-Inférieure, to Bordeaux, Gironde.
Elizabeth	United Kingdom	The ship ran aground on the Red Sand Swashway, off the coast of Kent. She was refloated and resumed her voyage to Prince Edward Island, British North America.
Henriette	Rostock	The derelict sloop was driven ashore at "Kramnitzgabe". She had been taken in to Rødby, Denmark, by 8 April.
Heroine	(United Kingdom of Great Britain and Ireland) New South Wales	The schooner was wrecked in the Torres Straits with the loss of eight lives. Survivors were rescued by Enchantress and Sapphire ( (United Kingdom of Great Britain and Ireland) New South Wales). Heroine was on a voyage from Sydney to Port Essington.
Jeune Théodore	France	The ship was lost near Rochefort, Charente-Maritime.

== 5 April ==
List of shipwrecks: 5 April 1846
Ship	State	Description
Carrs	United Kingdom	The ship ran aground off Helsingør, Denmark. She was refloated and resumed her voyage.
Courier	Sweden	The galeass was driven ashore at Puttgarden, Duchy of Holstein, where she later became a wreck. She was on a voyage from Kalmar to Kiel, Prussia.
Fernand	France	The ship was lost at "Annosipore". Her crew were rescued. She was on a voyage from Calcutta, India, to Île Bourbon.
George and Thomas	United Kingdom	The ship was wrecked on the Binks, in the North Sea off the mouth of the Humber. Her crew were rescued. She was on a voyage from Sunderland, County Durham, to Cowes, Isle of Wight.
James	United Kingdom	The brig was driven ashore and severely damaged at Sunderland.
San Francisco	Spain	The brig ran aground on the Longsand, in the North Sea off the coast of Essex, United Kingdom, and sank. Her crew were rescued by William Watson (United Kingdom). San Francisco was on a voyage from Peterhead, Aberdeenshire, United Kingdom, to Barcelona.
Snowdrop	United Kingdom	The ship was driven ashore and wrecked at Huttoft, Lincolnshire. She was on a voyage from Great Yarmouth, Norfolk, to Goole, Yorkshire.

== 6 April ==
List of shipwrecks: 6 April 1846
Ship	State	Description
Beonhardine	United Kingdom	The ship was driven ashore at South Shields, County Durham. She was on a voyage from Aberdeen to South Shields.
Concord	(United Kingdom of Great Britain and Ireland) Jersey	The ship was abandoned in the Atlantic Ocean. Her crew were rescued by Catherina (United Kingdom). Concord was on a voyage from Newport, Monmouthshire, to Málaga, Spain.
Coromandel	United States	The ship ran aground at the mouth of the Mississippi River. She was on a voyage from New Orleans, Louisiana, to Liverpool, Lancashire, United Kingdom. Coromandel was refloated on 11 April.
Harvest	United States	The ship was driven ashore south of Baltimore, Maryland. She was on a voyage from St. Ubes, Portugal, to Baltimore. She was refloated the next day and taken in to Baltimore.
John	United Kingdom	The ship ran aground off Helsingør, Denmark. She was refloated and resumed her voyage.
Scotsman	United Kingdom	The ship ran aground in the River Wear. She was refloated on 9 April.

== 7 April ==
List of shipwrecks: 7 April 1846
Ship	State	Description
Bernhardine	United Kingdom	The galiot ran aground on the Herd Sand, in the North Sea off the coast of County Durham. Her crew were rescued. She was on a voyage from Aberdeen to South Shields, County Durham.
Magnet	United Kingdom	The ship ran aground at Port Talbot, Glamorgan.
Martha	United Kingdom	The ship ran aground at Port Talbot. She was refloated.
Scotsman	United Kingdom	The brig was driven ashore in the River Wear. She was on a voyage from Aberdeen to Sunderland, County Durham.

== 8 April ==
List of shipwrecks: 8 April 1846
Ship	State	Description
Isabella	(United Kingdom of Great Britain and Ireland) Jersey	The ship was driven ashore and damaged at Gibraltar. She was refloated the next day.

== 9 April ==
List of shipwrecks: 9 April 1846
Ship	State	Description
Alexander Robertson	United Kingdom	The ship ran aground in the Dardanelles. She was on a voyage from Leith, Lothian, to Constantinople, Ottoman Empire.
Louisa	Prussia	The ship ran aground at Helsingør, Denmark. She was on a voyage from Memel to Dublin, United Kingdom. She was refloated on 11 April and resumed her voyage.
Maria	United Kingdom	The ship sank in the Bristol Channel off the mouth of the River Taff. She was on a voyage from Cardiff, Glamorgan, to Penzance, Cornwall. She was refloated on 17 April and beached at Penarth, Glamorgan.

== 10 April ==
List of shipwrecks: 10 April 1846
Ship	State	Description
Chesapeake	United States	The ship ran aground at the mouth of the Mississippi River.
Leontine	Bremen	The ship ran aground at the mouth of the Mississippi River.

== 11 April ==
List of shipwrecks: 11 April 1846
Ship	State	Description
Axel	France	The ship was driven ashore and wrecked on Squan Beach, Manasquan, New Jersey, United States. She was on a voyage from Cette, Hérault to New York, United States.
Cicero	United Kingdom	The ship ran aground on the Arklow Bank, in the Irish Sea off the coast of County Wexford. She was refloated and put in to Dublin in a leaky condition.
Domain	(United Kingdom of Great Britain and Ireland) New South Wales	The cutter was wrecked on the west coast of Wilson's Promontory with the loss of all but one of her crew.
Duchess of Northumberland	United Kingdom	The ship ran aground in the Hever. She was on a voyage from Liverpool, Lancashire, to Husum, Duchy of Holstein. She was refloated and taken in to Husum.
Emerald	United Kingdom	The ship ran aground at the mouth of the Mississippi River. She was on a voyage from New Orleans, Louisiana, United States, to Liverpool.
HMS Osprey	Royal Navy	The brig was wrecked 18 miles (29 km) north of the Hokianga Harbour, New Zealand. A headland was mistaken for a promontory at the entrance to the harbour, and the ship turned in to the coast, running aground.
Sportsman	United Kingdom	The ship was run into by the barque Dygden (Russia) and was beached at Gibraltar. She was on a voyage from Benicarló, Spain, to Saint Petersburg, Russia.
Victoria	United Kingdom	The ship ran aground in the Cape Fear River. She was on a voyage from Wilmington, North Carolina, United States, to Halifax, Nova Scotia, British North America. She was refloated and put back to Wilmington for repairs.

== 12 April ==
List of shipwrecks: 12 April 1846
Ship	State	Description
Goodwill	United Kingdom	The ship put into Shoreham-by-Sea, Sussex in a waterlogged condition and sank. She was on a voyage from Harwich, Essex, to Portsmouth, Hampshire.
Modern Athens	United Kingdom	The paddle steamer caught fire and sank in the North Sea. She was on a voyage from Montrose, Forfarshire, to Edinburgh, Lothian.
Rosa	Spain	The ship was driven ashore and wrecked in the Mobile River. She was on a voyage from Mobile, Alabama, United States, to Havana, Cuba.
Three Brothers	United Kingdom	The ship was driven ashore at Shoreham-by-Sea. She was on a voyage from Honfleur, Calvados, France, to Shoreham-by-Sea. She was refloated and taken in to port.

== 13 April ==
List of shipwrecks: 15 April 1846
Ship	State	Description
Mastery	(United Kingdom of Great Britain and Ireland) Jersey	The ship was wrecked on Sand Island. Her crew were rescued. She was on a voyage from Liverpool, Lancashire, to the Rio Nuñez.
Robert Burns	United Kingdom	The ship was in collision with Helen Hamilton (United Kingdom) in the Irish Sea and was abandoned. Her crew were rescued by Helen Hamilton. Robert Burns was on a voyage from Cardiff, Glamorgan, to Kinsale, County Cork. She was taken in to Cork by Jane (United Kingdom) on 17 April.

== 15 April ==
List of shipwrecks: 15 April 1846
Ship	State	Description
Catherine	France	The brigantine was wrecked at Port-aux-Poules, Algeria. Her crew were rescued.
Felix	United Kingdom	The schooner was driven ashore at Nantucket Point, Massachusetts, United States. She was on a voyage from Arichat, Nova Scotia, British North America, to New York, United States. She was refloated on 20 April and completed her voyage.
Généreux	France	The ship was wrecked at Akkerman, Russia. She was on a voyage from Odesa to Malta and Cephalonia, United States of the Ionian Islands.
Herschel	United States	The barque ran aground in the Mississippi River. She was refloated and put back to New Orleans, Louisiana, for repairs.
Hope	United Kingdom	The ship was discovered abandoned and derelict off the Canary Islands. She was towed in to Graciosa.
Jupiter	United Kingdom	The steamship ran aground and capsized in the River Avon. She was on a voyage from Cork to Bristol, Gloucestershire. Jupiter was refloated the next day and towed in to Bristol.
Ralph Wylam	United Kingdom	The ship was wrecked on Stroma, Orkney Islands. Her crew were rescued. She was on a voyage from South Shields, County Durham, to Quebec City, Province of Canada, British North America.
Virginia	United Kingdom	The brig ran aground in the Mississippi River. She was refloated and put back to New Orleans for repairs.

== 16 April ==
List of shipwrecks: April 1846
Ship	State	Description
Durham Packet	United Kingdom	The ship foundered in the North Sea off Whitby, Yorkshire. Her crew were rescued. She was on a voyage from Seaham, County Durham, to Honfleur, Calvados, France.
Emblem	United Kingdom	The ship sank off the South Bishop Lighthouse, Pembrokeshire. Her crew were rescued. She was on a voyage from Newport, Monmouthshire, to Liverpool, Lancashire.
Poland	United Kingdom	The ship was holed by ice and sank in the Bay of Riga. Her crew were rescued.

== 17 April ==
List of shipwrecks: 17 April 1846
Ship	State	Description
Enterprise	United Kingdom	The ship was driven ashore at Breaksea Point, Glamorgan. She was refloated on 22 April and taken in to Cardiff.
Good Intent	United Kingdom	The sloop was driven ashore at Wainfleet, Lincolnshire. She was on a voyage from Boston, Lincolnshire, to Leeds or Wakefield, Yorkshire.
Jane	(United Kingdom of Great Britain and Ireland) New South Wales	The cutter was driven ashore and wrecked at Mount Martha.
Maria Margaretha	Netherlands	The ship was driven ashore on Ameland, Friesland. She was on a voyage from Hamburg to Amsterdam, North Holland.

== 18 April ==
List of shipwrecks: 18 April 1846
Ship	State	Description
Aristocrat	United Kingdom	The brig was wrecked on the coast of Patagonia, Argentina. Her crew were rescued.
Elizabeth	United Kingdom	The brig was wrecked on Viana Island, Patagonia. Her crew were rescued.
Ellen	United Kingdom	The brig was wrecked on Viana Island.
Fox	United Kingdom	The brig was wrecked on Viana Island. Her crew were rescued.
Good Intent	United Kingdom	The ship was driven ashore near Saltfleet, Lincolnshire. She was on a voyage from Boston, Lincolnshire, to Wakefield, Yorkshire. She was refloated the next day and taken in to Wainfleet, Lincolnshire.
Haabet	Denmark	The ship was wrecked on Heligoland. Her crew were rescued. She was on a voyage from Thisted to Hamburg.
Hannibal	United Kingdom	The ship ran aground on the Cabadello Rocks, off the coast of Portugal. Her crew were rescued. She was on a voyage from Newcastle upon Tyne, Northumberland, to Porto, Portugal. She floated off and was wrecked on the Senhora de Pedra Rocks.
Helen	United Kingdom	The brig was wrecked on Viana Island. Her crew were rescued.
Honesta	United Kingdom	The ship was driven ashore and wrecked at Agrigento, Sicily.
Maria Soames	United Kingdom	The ship was wrecked at Mauritius with the loss of fourteen lives.
Mary Lloyd	United Kingdom	The barque in collision with the brig Dromo (United Kingdom) and foundered off Viana Island. Her crew were rescued.
Neptune	United Kingdom	The barque was wrecked on Viana Island.
Sea Nymph	United Kingdom	The brig was wrecked Ton Island, on the coast of Patagonia. Her crew were rescued.
Seduisant	France	The ship sprang a leak and foundered in the Atlantic Ocean. She was on a voyage from "Port Royal", Martinique to Havre de Grâce, Seine-Inférieure.
Victoria Regina	(United Kingdom of Great Britain and Ireland) Guernsey	The brigantine was wrecked on Viana Island. Her crew were rescued.

== 19 April ==
List of shipwrecks: 19 April 1846
Ship	State	Description
Lady Falkland	(United Kingdom of Great Britain and Ireland) British North America	The barque was in collision with the schooner Martha ( (United Kingdom of Great Britain and Ireland) Guernsey) and foundered in the English Channel 6 nautical miles (11 km) off Beachy Head, Sussex. All on board were rescued by Martha. Lady Falkland was on a voyage from New York to London, United Kingdom.
Louisa	(United Kingdom of Great Britain and Ireland) British North America	The ship was wrecked at Cabañas, Cuba.
Pollis	(Russian Empire) Grand Duchy of Finland	The ship ran aground off "Syngarn", Sweden. She was on a voyage from St Ubes, Portugal, to Pori. She was refloated and taken in to Syngarn in a leaky condition.
Wilmot	United Kingdom	The barque was driven ashore and wrecked at Pernambuco, Brazil. Her crew were rescued.

== 20 April ==
List of shipwrecks: 20 April 1846
Ship	State	Description
Cecilia	United Kingdom	The ship ran aground and was wrecked at Tobasco.
Gem	United Kingdom	The ship was driven ashore and wrecked on São Miguel Island, Azores.
Gentoo or Jentoo	United States	The ship was wrecked on Cape Agulhas, Cape Colony with the loss of seven of the 24 people on board. She was on a voyage from Calcutta to Boston, Massachusetts.
Loyal	United Kingdom	The ship was wrecked on Schiermonnikoog, Groningen, Netherlands. Her crew were rescued. She was on a voyage from Stockton-on-Tees, County Durham, to Hamburg.
Providence	United Kingdom	The ship ran aground on the Barnard Sand or Beacon Ridge, in the North Sea off the coast of Norfolk. She was on a voyage from Grimsby, Lincolnshire, to Ipswich, Suffolk. She was refloated and taken in to Lowestoft, Suffolk, in a waterlogged and derelict condition.

== 21 April ==
List of shipwrecks: 21 April 1846
Ship	State	Description
Hope	United Kingdom	The ship was driven ashore at the Mumbles, Glamorgan. She was on a voyage from Port Talbot to Porthcawl. She was refloated the next day.

== 22 April ==
List of shipwrecks: 22 April 1846
Ship	State	Description
Rosa	Spain	The ship was driven ashore and wrecked at New York, United States. She was on a voyage from New York to Barcelona.
Vrouw Imke	United Kingdom	The ship foundered off Carolinensiel, Kingdom of Hanover. Her crew were rescued. She was on a voyage from Hamburg to Amsterdam, North Holland.

== 23 April ==
List of shipwrecks: 23 April 1846
Ship	State	Description
Criterion	United Kingdom	The ship ran aground on the Elleboog Sand, in the North Sea off the coast of Zeeland, Netherlands. She was on a voyage from Cardiff, Glamorgan, to Rotterdam, South Holland, Netherlands.
Harriet Rockwell	United States	The barque ran aground in the River Lee. She was refloated the next day.
Honest	United Kingdom	The ship was severely damaged at Agrigento, Sicily. She was on a voyage from Licata, Sicily, to a British port.
Mayda	(United Kingdom of Great Britain and Ireland) Van Diemen's Land	The ship departed from Launceston for London. No further trace, presumed foundered with the loss of all hands.
Saucy Jack	United Kingdom	The schooner foundered off the Mull of Kintyre, Argyllshire. Her crew were rescued. She was on a voyage from Islay to Glasgow, Renfrewshire.

== 24 April ==
List of shipwrecks: 24 April 1846
Ship	State	Description
Achilles	United Kingdom	The ship was destroyed by fire in the Indian Ocean. Her crew were rescued by Ariel (United Kingdom). Achilles was on a voyage from Calcutta, India, to Liverpool, Lancashire.
Heroine	United Kingdom	The brigantine was wrecked in the Torres Straits with the loss of eight lives.
Ingeborg Caroline	Norway	The ship ran aground of the Longsand, in the North Sea off the coast of Essex, United Kingdom. She was on a voyage from Gothenburg, Sweden, to Saint-Valery-sur-Somme, Somme, France. She was refloated on 24 April and taken in to Harwich, Essex, in a leaky condition.
James and Thomas	United Kingdom	The barque ran aground on the English Bank, in the Atlantic Ocean off the coast of Uruguay.
Lyra	United Kingdom	The brig was sunk by ice in the Grand Banks of Newfoundland. Her crew were rescued by Hero (United Kingdom). Lyra was on a voyage from Sunderland, County Durham, to Montreal, Province of Canada, British North America.
Mandarin	United Kingdom	The ship was wrecked on the Alligator Reef. Her crew were rescued. sHe was on a voyage from Calcutta, India, to Jamaica and Liverpool, Lancashire.
Spring	United Kingdom	The ship was wrecked on the Onion Sand, in the North Sea off the coast of Suffolk. Her crew were rescued. She was on a voyage from London to Newcastle upon Tyne, Northumberland.
Victoria	(United Kingdom of Great Britain and Ireland) British North America	The schooner was driven ashore at Cape Canso, Nova Scotia. She was on a voyage from Boston, Massachusetts, to Saint Pierre and Martinique.

== 25 April ==
List of shipwrecks: 25 April 1846
Ship	State	Description
Nancy	United Kingdom	The ship was driven ashore 3 nautical miles (5.6 km) east of Almería, Spain. She was on a voyage from Newcastle upon Tyne, Northumberland, to Garrucha or Villaricos, Spain. She was refloated on 30 April and taken in to Almería.
Thetis	United Kingdom	The schooner was driven ashore on Long Point in Provincetown, Massachusetts, United States, where she was damaged by fire. She was later refloated and taken in to Salem, Massachusetts.

== 26 April ==
List of shipwrecks: 26 April 1846
Ship	State	Description
Africa	United Kingdom	The brig was wrecked at Ascension Island.
Catherine	(United Kingdom of Great Britain and Ireland) British North America	The ship was abandoned in the Atlantic Ocean. Her crew were rescued by a French brig.
Harriet	Denmark	The East Indiaman, a barque, was in collision with the East Indiaman brig Seringapatam (United Kingdom) and was abandoned in the English Channel off Beachy Head, Sussex, United Kingdom. She was on a voyage from Saint Croix, Virgin Islands, to Copenhagen. She was beached between Brighton and Hove, Sussex, in a capsized condition on 28 April.
Heir of Madryn	United Kingdom	The ship ran aground and was severely damaged at Blyth, Northumberland.
Heroine	(United Kingdom of Great Britain and Ireland) New South Wales	The ship was wrecked on a reef off the Cumberland Islands with the loss of eight lives. She was on a voyage from Sydney to Port Essington.
James and Elizabeth	United Kingdom	The ship was wrecked on the Buxey Sand, in the North Sea off the coast of Essex. She was on a voyage from London to Southwold, Suffolk.
Maria	United Kingdom	The ship ran aground on the Goodwin Sands, Kent. She was on a voyage from Limerick to Antwerp, Belgium. She was refloated and resumed her voyage.
Nordstjer	Russia	The ship ran aground on the Kleinen Tytlers and was damaged. She was on a voyage from Messina, Sicily, to Kronstadt. She was refloated on 28 April and arrived at Kronstadt in a leaky condition.

== 27 April ==
List of shipwrecks: 27 April 1846
Ship	State	Description
Betsey and Ann	United Kingdom	The ship foundered in the North Sea 13 nautical miles (24 km) off South Shields, County Durham. Her crew were rescued. She was on a voyage from South Shields to the Firth of Forth.
Helen	United Kingdom	The ship was abandoned by her crew and scuttled in the North Sea off Bridlington, Yorkshire. She was on a voyage from Swinemünde, Prussia, to Sunderland, County Durham. The crew were charged with barratry. They were acquitted.

== 28 April ==
List of shipwrecks: 28 April 1846
Ship	State	Description
Energy	United Kingdom	The ship was driven ashore at Memel, Prussia. She was refloated on 4 May and taken in to Memel in a waterlogged condition.
Governor Halkett	United Kingdom	The ship was on the coast of Patagonia, Argentina. Her crew were rescued.
Mexico	United Kingdom	The ship ran aground and was damaged at Hartlepool, County Durham. She was on a voyage from Hartlepool to Saint Petersburg, Russia. She was refloated and put back to Hartlepool.
Sleepless	United Kingdom	The brig ran aground and was damaged at Sunderland, County Durham. She was on a voyage from Sunderland to Saint Petersburg, Russia. She was refloated and resumed her voyage, but consequently put back to Sunderland in a leaky condition.
Speculanten	Norway	The ship sank at South Shields, County Durham. She was on a voyage from Brevik to Anstruther, Fife, United Kingdom.

== 30 April ==
List of shipwrecks: 30 April 1846
Ship	State	Description
Ewer Landdrost	Duchy of Holstein	The ship was driven ashore on Skagen, Denmark. She was on a voyage from an English port to Flensburg. She was later refloated and taken in to Frederikshavn, Denmark, for repairs.
Nancy Packet	United Kingdom	The ship was driven ashore at Yarmouth, Isle of Wight. She was on a voyage from Southampton, Hampshire, to Weymouth, Dorset.
Rebecca	(United Kingdom of Great Britain and Ireland) British North America	The schooner departed from Kempt, Nova Scotia, for Salem, Massachusetts, United States. No further trace, presumed foundered with the loss of all hands.
Ruth	United Kingdom	The ship was attacked by Moorish pirates and was abandoned by her crew off the Barbary Coast. She was on a voyage from Messina, Sicily, to Saint Petersburg, Russia.

== Unknown date ==
List of shipwrecks: Unknown date in April 1846
Ship	State	Description
Auguste	Belgium	The ship was lost off Gore Island, Mexico, before 11 April. Her crew were rescued.
Britannia	United Kingdom	The Yorkshire Billyboy foundered in the English Channel off the Isle of Wight before 4 April.
Britannia	United Kingdom	The ship foundered in the North Sea off Flamborough Head, Yorkshire, before 1 May.
Caroline	United Kingdom	The ship ran aground on the Longsand, in the North Sea off the coast of Essex. She was refloated and assisted in to Harwich.
Conelia Catherina	Belgium	The ship was lost off Faro, Portugal, with the loss of all but three of her crew. She was on a voyage from Messina, Sicily, to Antwerp.
Hunter	United Kingdom	The schooner was presumed to have foundered with the loss of all hands whilst on a voyage from Llanelly, Glamorgan, to Limerick.
Inverness	(United Kingdom of Great Britain and Ireland) British North America	The sealer was lost in ice off the coast of Newfoundland before 30 April. Her crew were rescued.
Jeune Corinne	France	The ship capsized in the Atlantic Ocean 45 leagues (135 nautical miles (250 km) off Pernambuco, Brazil, before 2 April. Her crew were rescued. She was on a voyage from the South Seas to Bordeaux, Gironde.
Mermaid	United Kingdom	The ship was wrecked on the Malabar Coast between 19 and 23 April.
Pollux	Netherlands	The ship was driven ashore and severely damaged in the Netherlands East Indies. She was on a voyage from Surabaya to Banjoewangie and the Netherlands. She was refloated and put back to Surabaya.
Prancer	United Kingdom	The ship ran aground on the Bahama Bank. She was refloated on 15 April and taken in to Nassau, Bahamas.
Shannon	United Kingdom	The ship was sunk by ice off Domesnes, Russia, before 11 April. Her crew were rescued.
Sidney	United States	The ship was abandoned in the Atlantic Ocean before 10 April. Her crew were rescued by Talbot (United Kingdom).
Trident	France	The ship was lost in the "Bay of Carmen".
Venus	United Kingdom	The sloop foundered in the North Sea off the coast of Norfolk before 4 April with the loss of all hands.
Wave	(United Kingdom of Great Britain and Ireland) New Zealand	The ship was wrecked on the Manawatu coast. All hands were saved.
Winipac	United States	The barque was driven ashore at Cork, United Kingdom. She was on a voyage from Cork to Havana, Cuba.
