= Von Krogh =

von Krogh is a surname. Notable people with the surname include:

- Adam Gottlob von Krogh (1768–1839), Norwegian-Danish military officer
- Charlotte Christiane von Krogh (1827–1913), Danish painter
- Georg von Krogh (born 1963), Norwegian academic
- Gerhard Christoph von Krogh (1785–1860), Danish noble and military officer
- Morten von Krogh (born 1948), Norwegian fencer
