= Schiffahrtsmuseum Nordfriesland =

Coordinates: 54.475383°N 9.051064°E

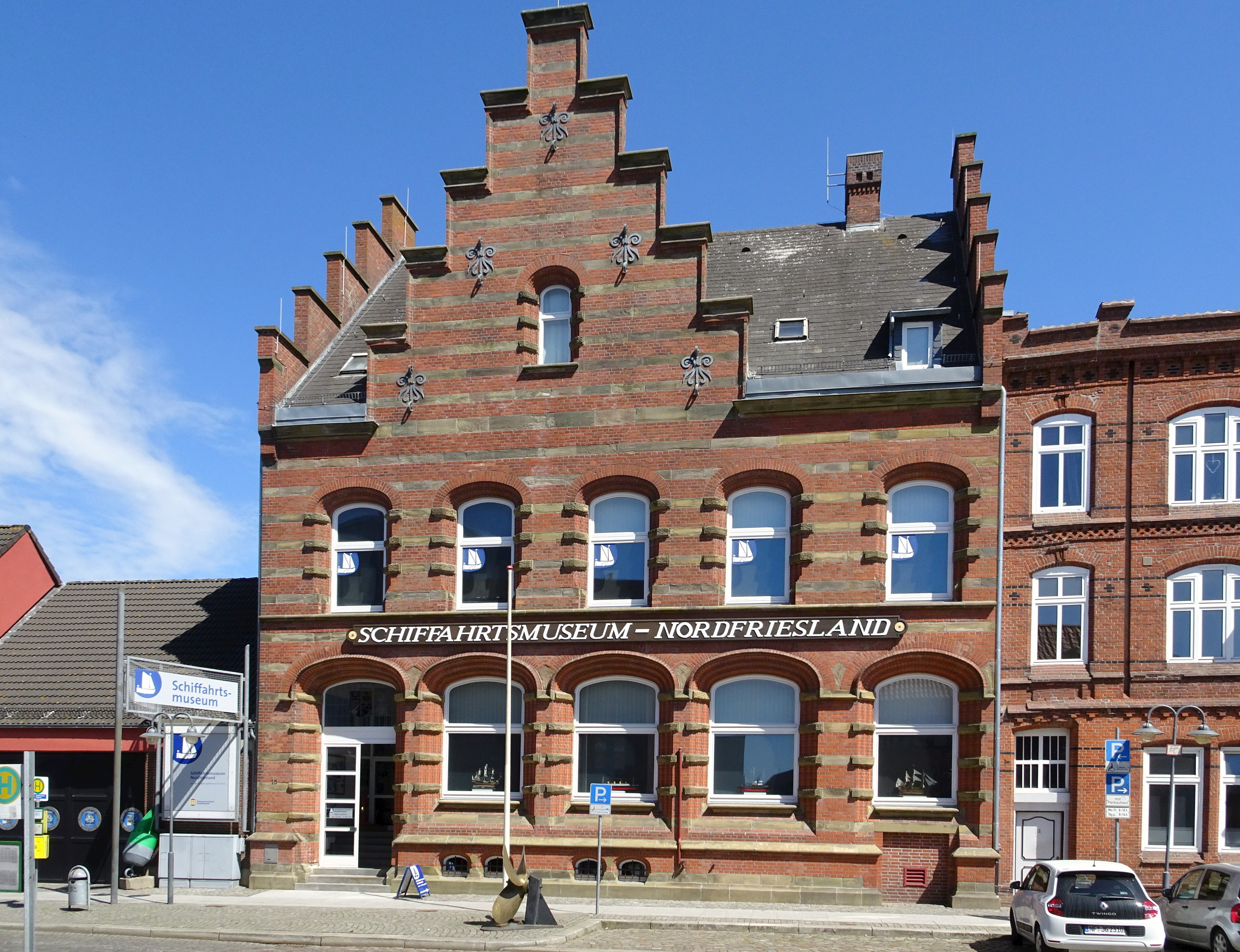
Maritime Museum building

The Schiffahrtsmuseum Nordfriesland (Maritime Museum of North Friesland, also spelled with two "f"s) is located at Zingel 15 in Husum, Schleswig-Holstein. Across four levels, the museum showcases the relationships between the city harbor and the Nordfriesland district's involvement in shipbuilding, navigation, whaling, and coastal fishing. Larger exhibits such as a historic slipway, engines, and anchors are located in the outdoor area.

== Ground level ==
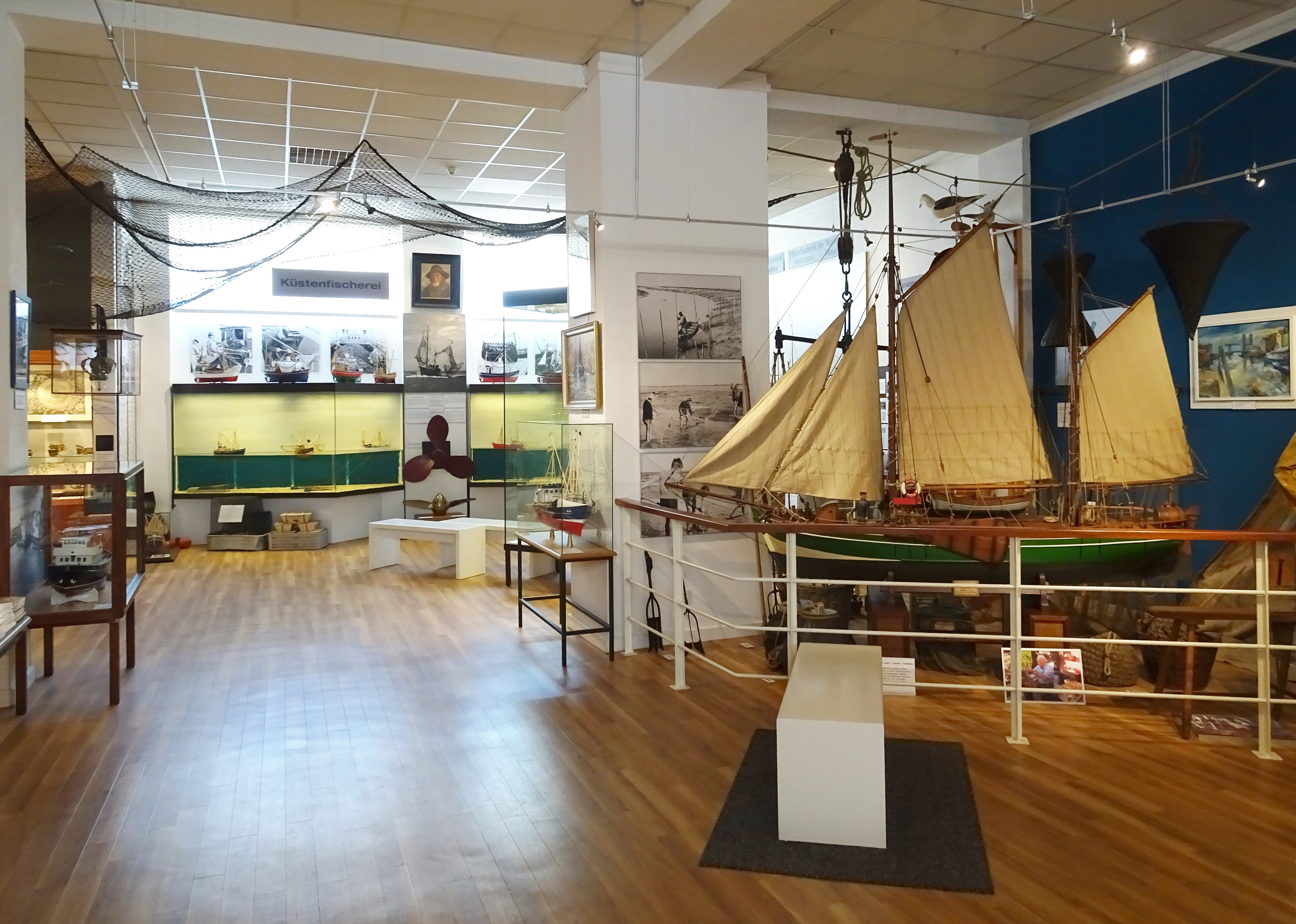
Ground level

The building of the Maritime Museum of North Friesland dates back to 1902 and is located at the tip of Husum's inner harbor, opposite the town hall. The museum was established in 1988/89 through private initiative. Visitors are informed about the history of wooden shipbuilding, tools, Wadden Sea fishing, whaling, shipping, ship navigation, and sea rescue on the ground floor. Part of the hull of a wooden ship, the stern of a so-called eiderschnigge in original size, shows the compact structure and stable rib construction. Additionally, a collection of maritime rarities and bottle ships are located on the ground floor. On the same level, but in the outdoor area, further exhibits such as a lighthouse, various boat and ship engines, anchors, buoys, and the rescue boat Eltje of the German Sea Rescue Society are displayed.

== Upper level ==
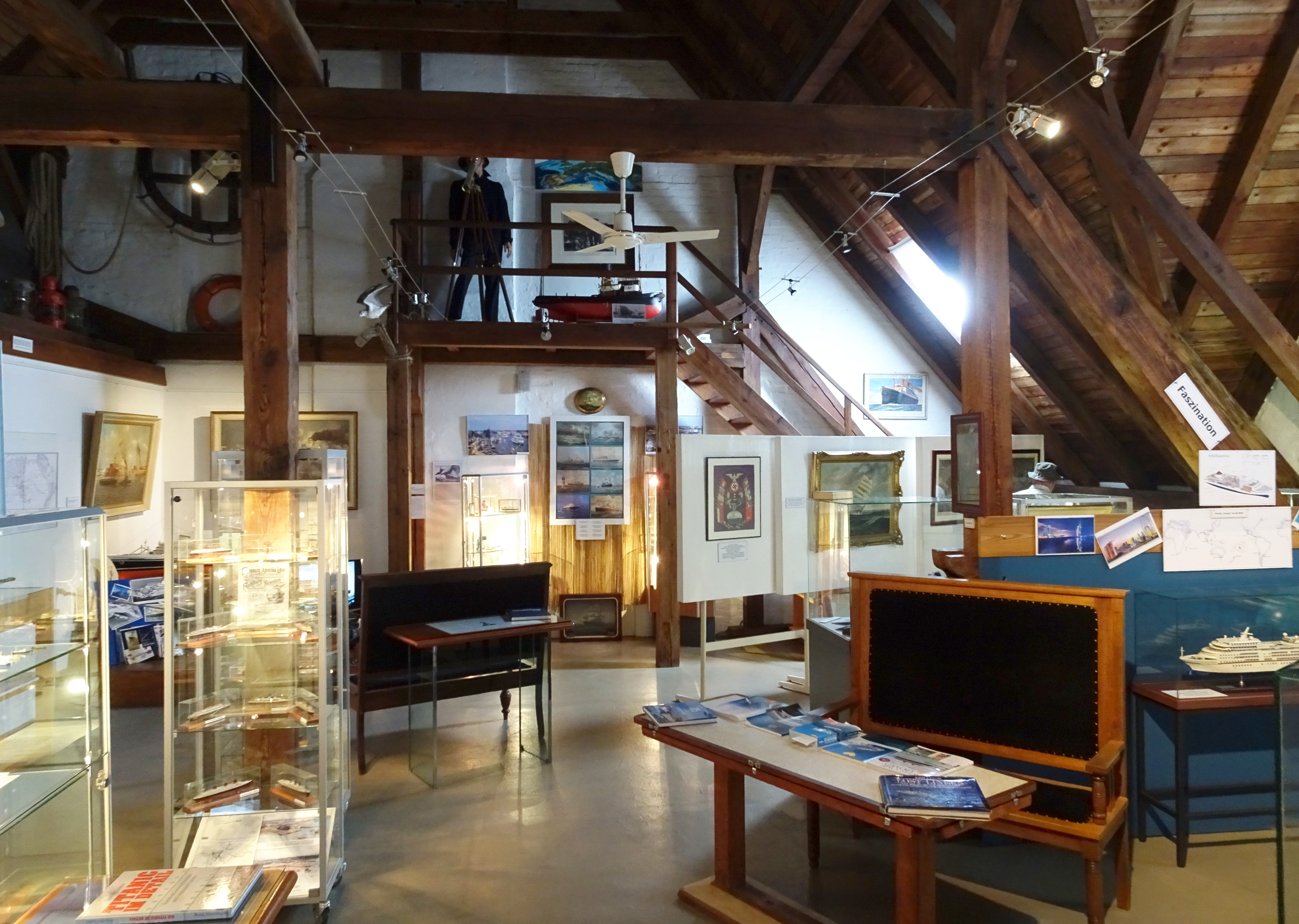
Upper level

Visitors can experience the layout of a ship's wheelhouse from the 1960s through an original-sized bridge of a small vessel equipped with a navigation stand, engine order telegraph, and other technical devices. By looking out the windows, visitors can see a realistic video of the ship setting sail. Additional topics include "1000 years under sail" and training shipping, which was conducted by some shipping companies and the navy. The visitor gains insights into the work of Husum cartographer Johannes Mejer, as well as North Sea tidal shipping and navigational aids (buoys and beacons, lighthouses, and lightships). In a separate room, the construction of steel ships from riveting to welding is presented, partially based on Husum Shipyard.

== Basement, attic, and inner harbour ==
In the basement and a modern extension, there's the wreck of a cargo sailing ship from around 1600, also known as the 'Sugar Ship.' A sugar water solution was used to preserve the sensitive oak wreck parts. The salvage and conservation of the wreck from July 1994 to 1997 are extensively documented on display boards and in a video.[3] In the adjacent room, there's a skin boat and various historical artifacts from the Wadden Sea. The attic is reserved for special maritime exhibitions and video screenings.

In the inner harbor, visitors can view the buoy tender Hildegard on a historical slipway, as well as large bulbous bows, the propeller of a large freighter, and a tall rigging mast.

== Images from the collection (selection) ==
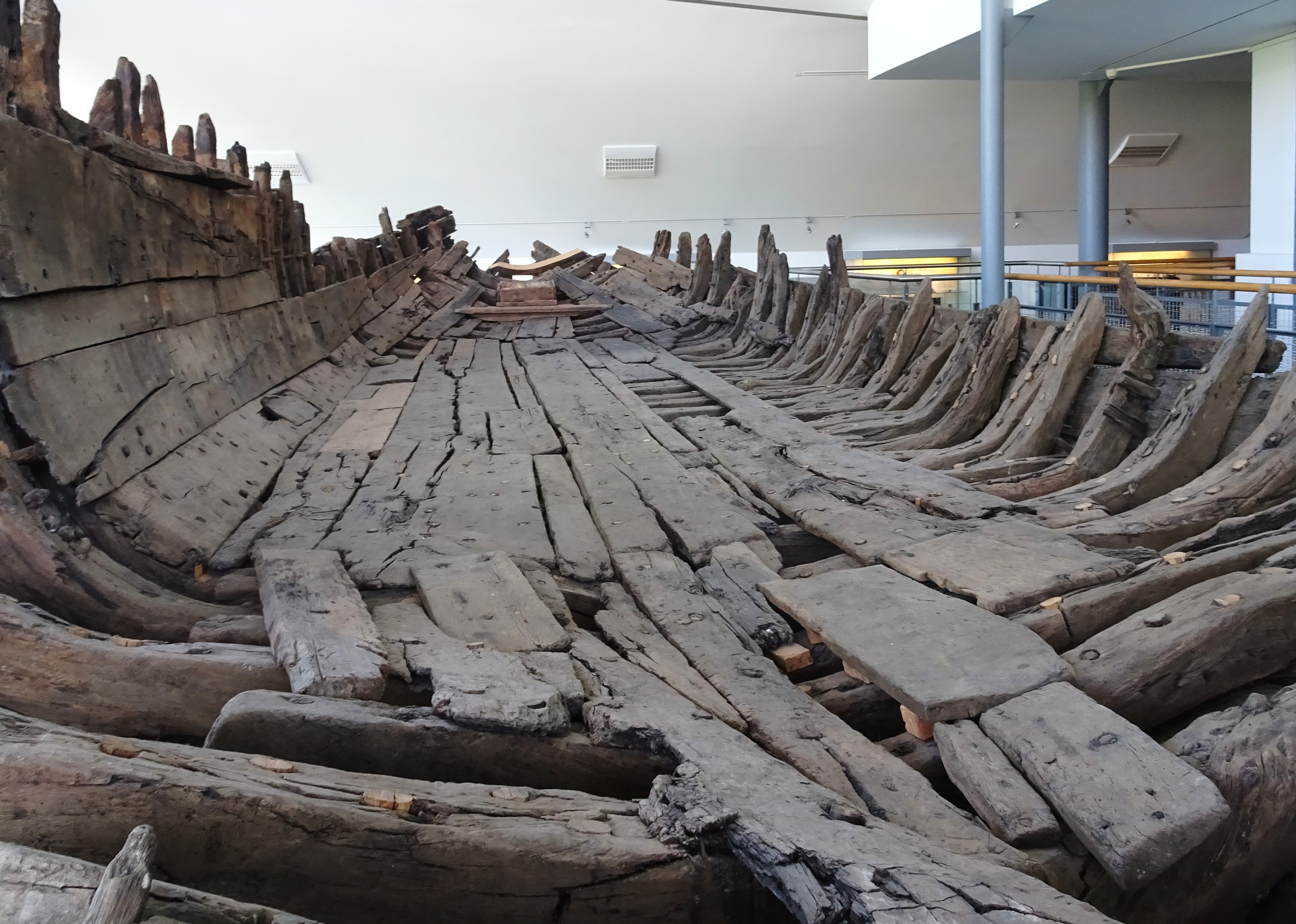
Wreck of a cargo sailing ship from Uelvesbüll (built around 1600)

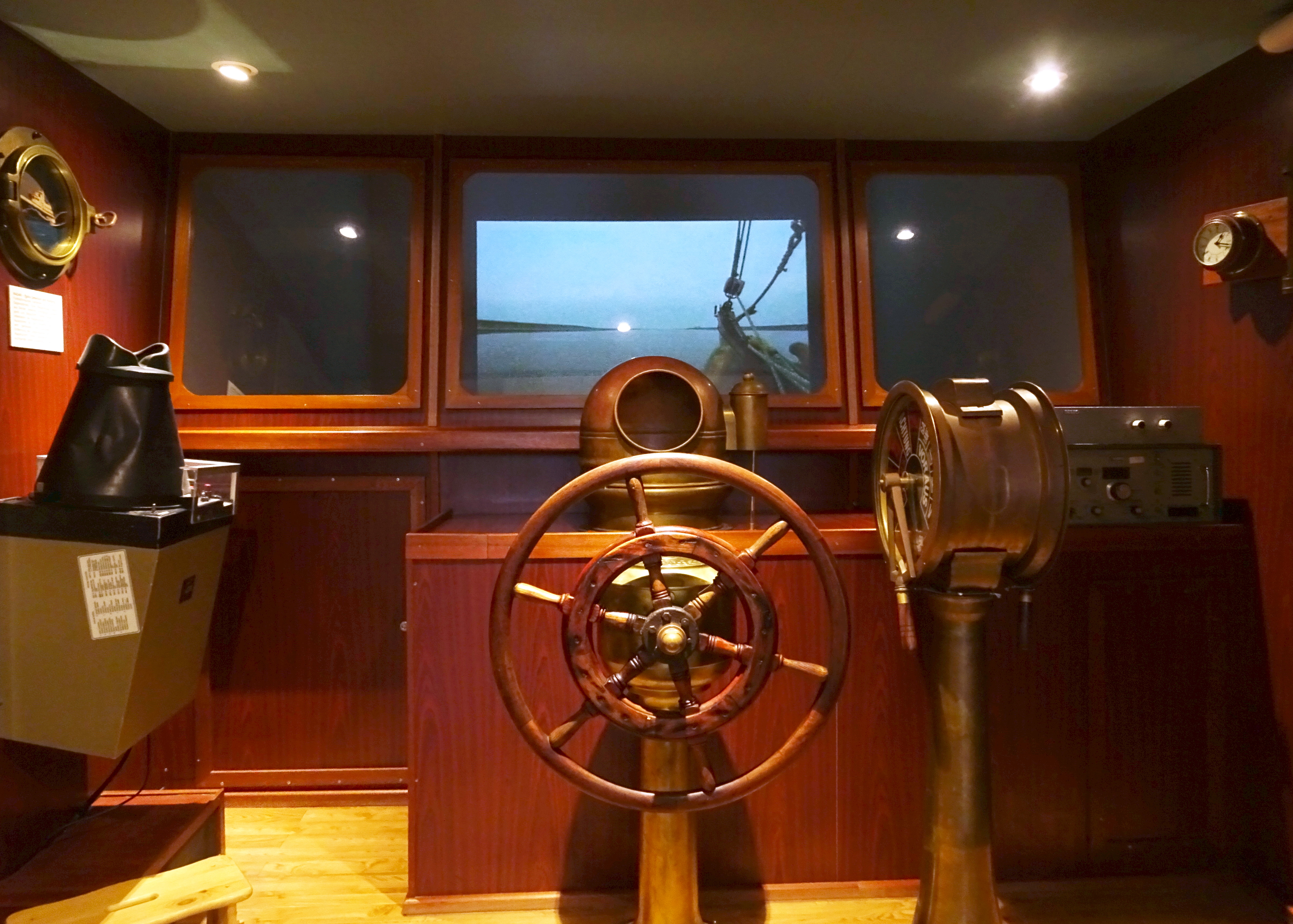
Helm of a small ship

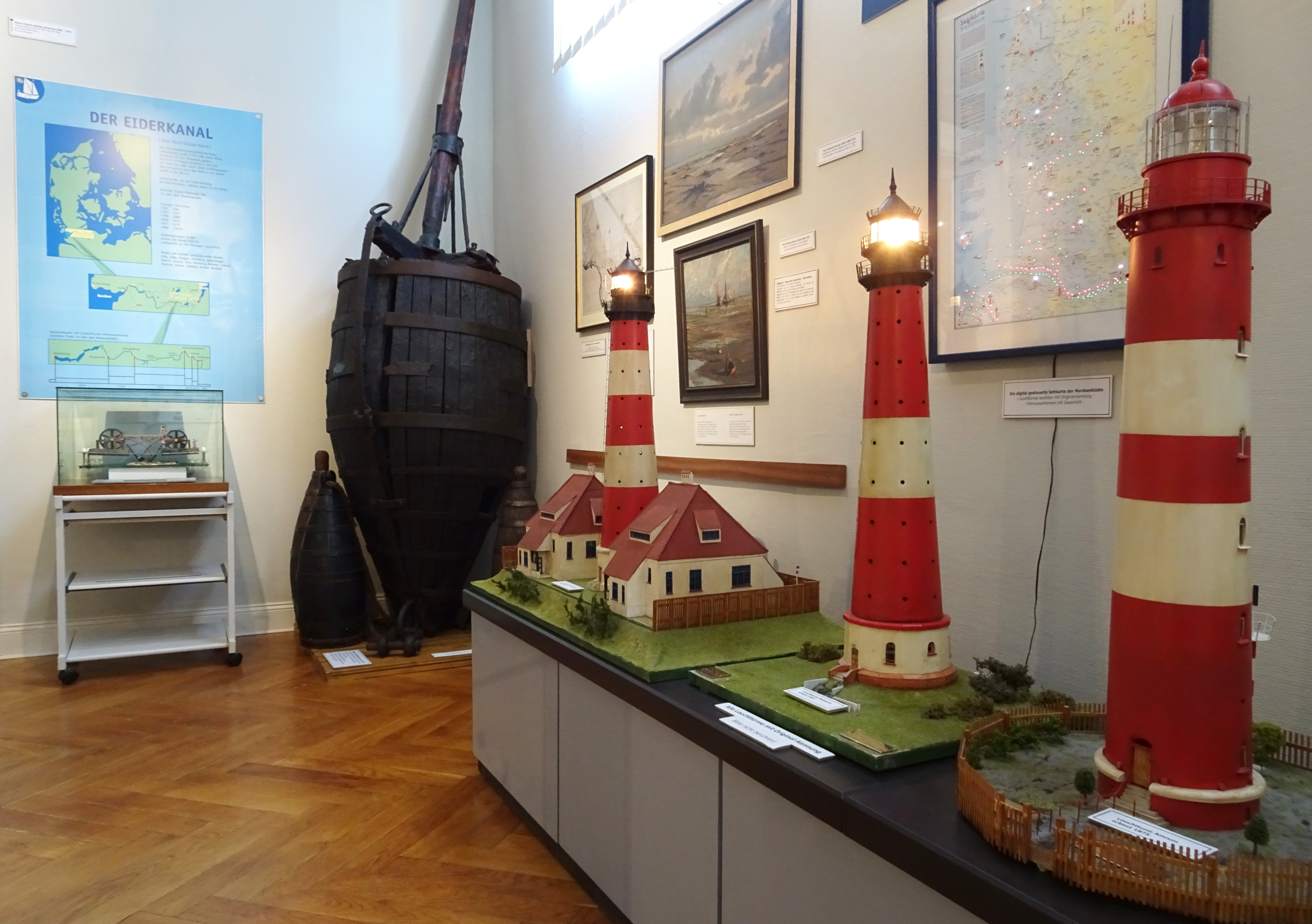
Lighthouse models

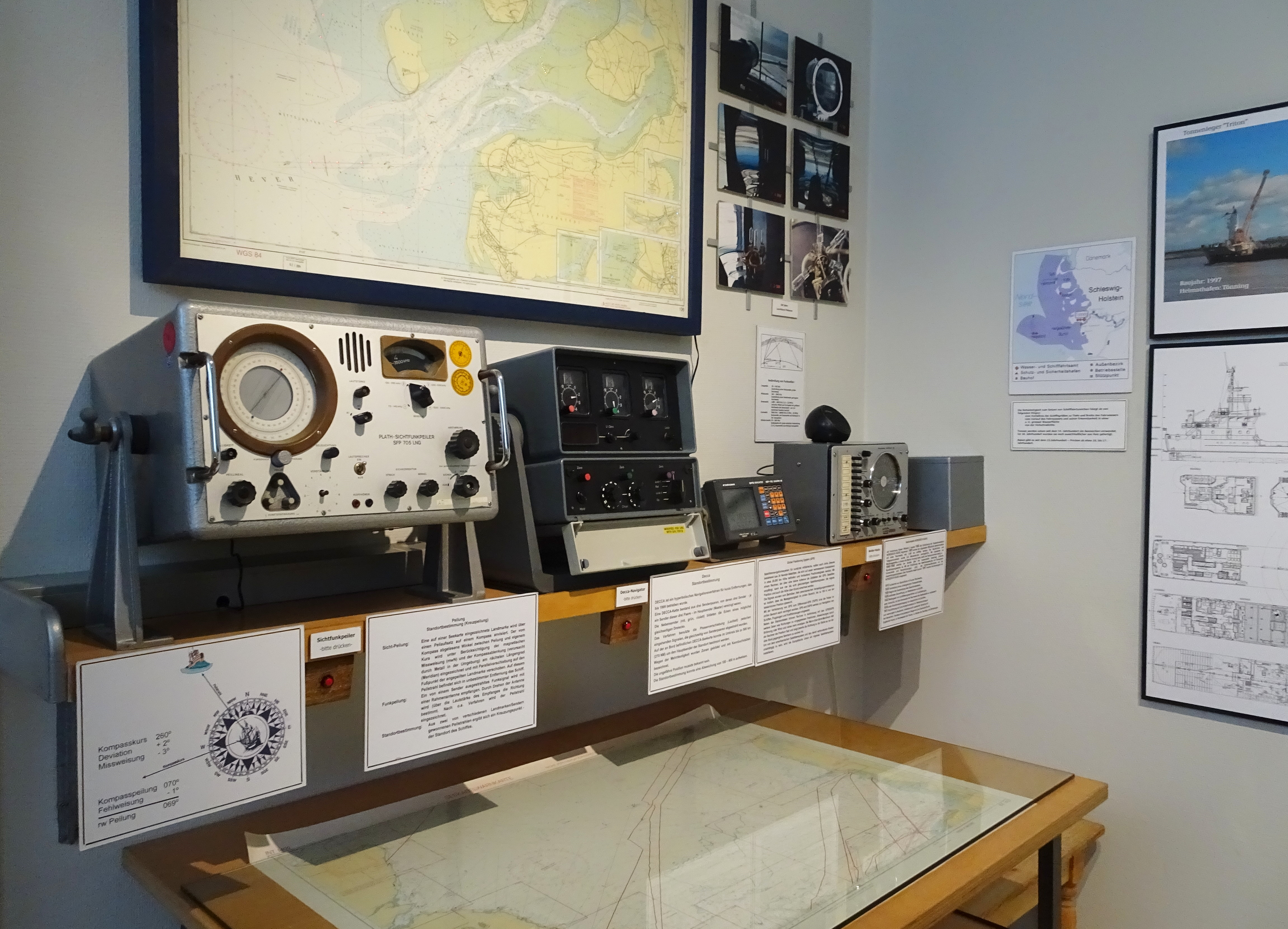
Radio communications

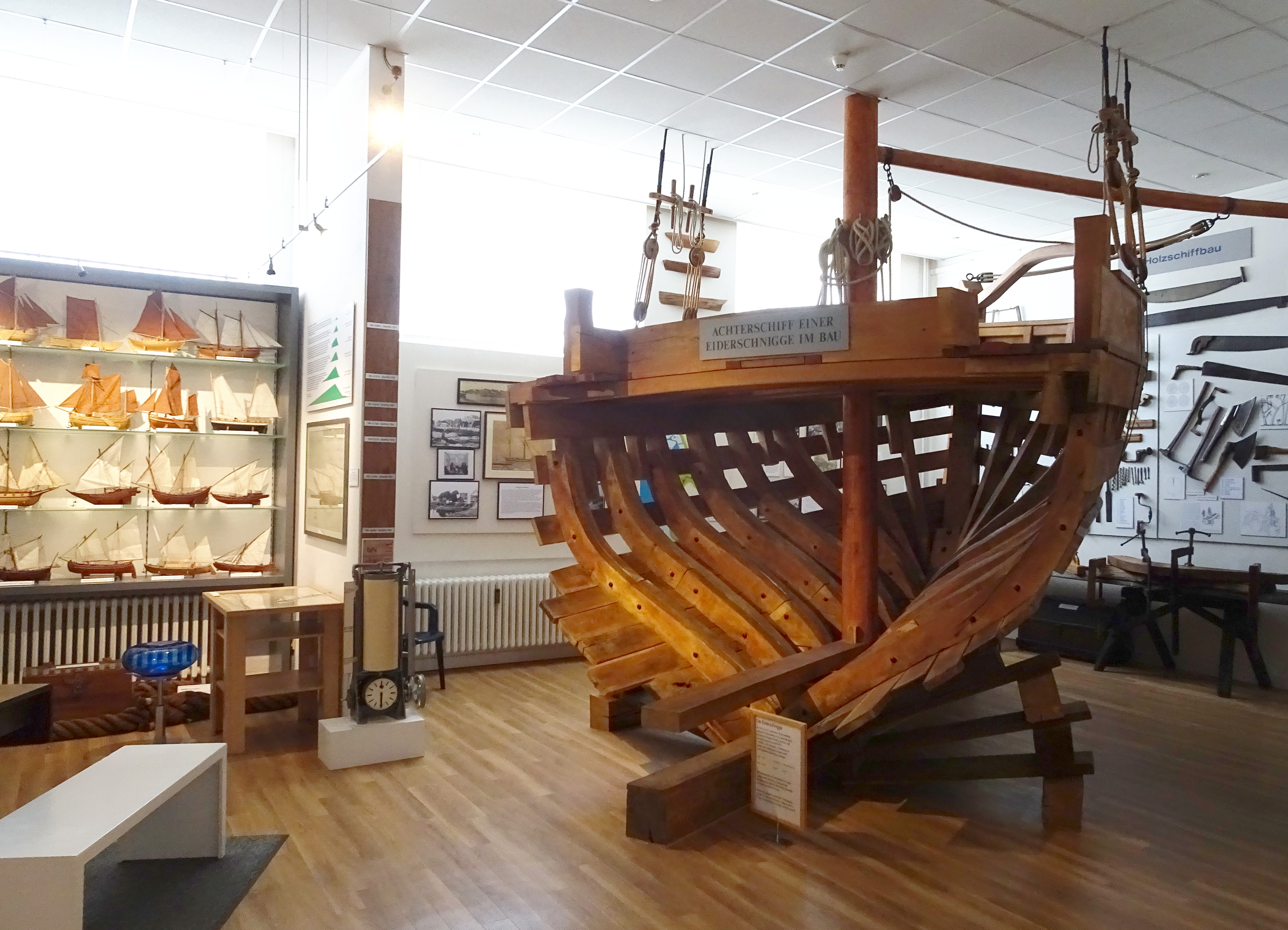
Full-size stern section of a longship

== Publications ==
- Klaus Lengsfeld: Schiffbau in Nordfriesland. In: Zwischen Eider und Wiedau: Heimatkalender Nordfriesland 1991. Nordfriesischer Verein für Heimatkunde und Heimatliebe und Heimatbund Eiderstedt (Hrsg.), Husum o. J., ISBN 3-88042-536-1, S. 101–106.
