= Johannes Mejer =

Danish mathematician and cartographer (1606–1674)

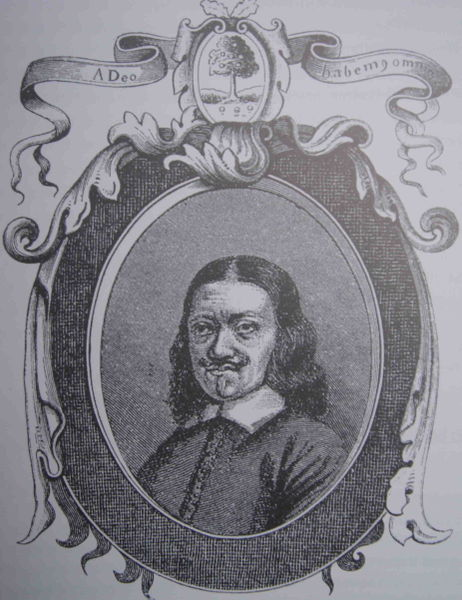
Johannes Mejer

Johannes Mejer (born 1606 in Husum; died 1674) was a mathematician and cartographer.

== Life ==
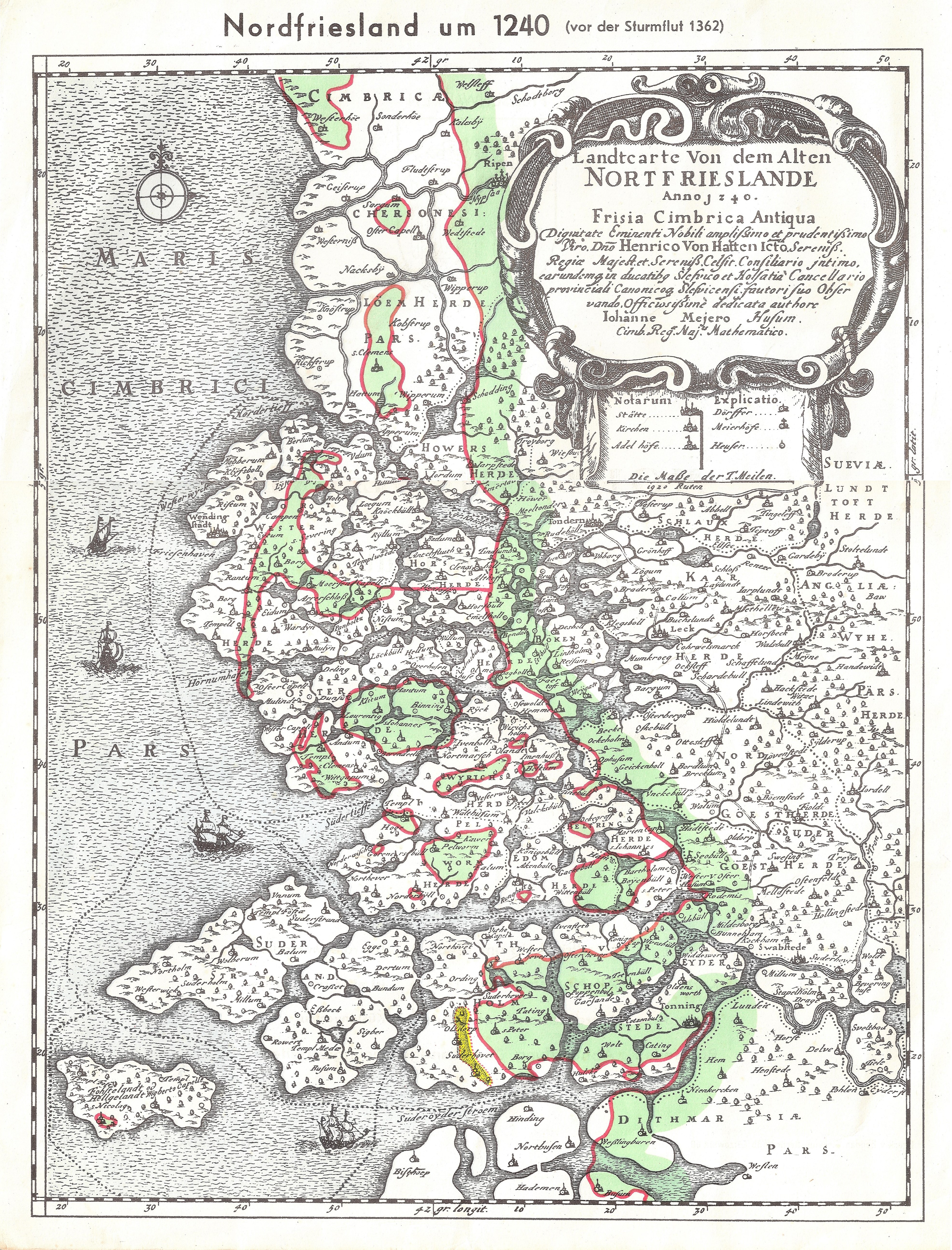
Map of Nordfriesland around 1240 (before the flood of 1362) by J. Mejer.

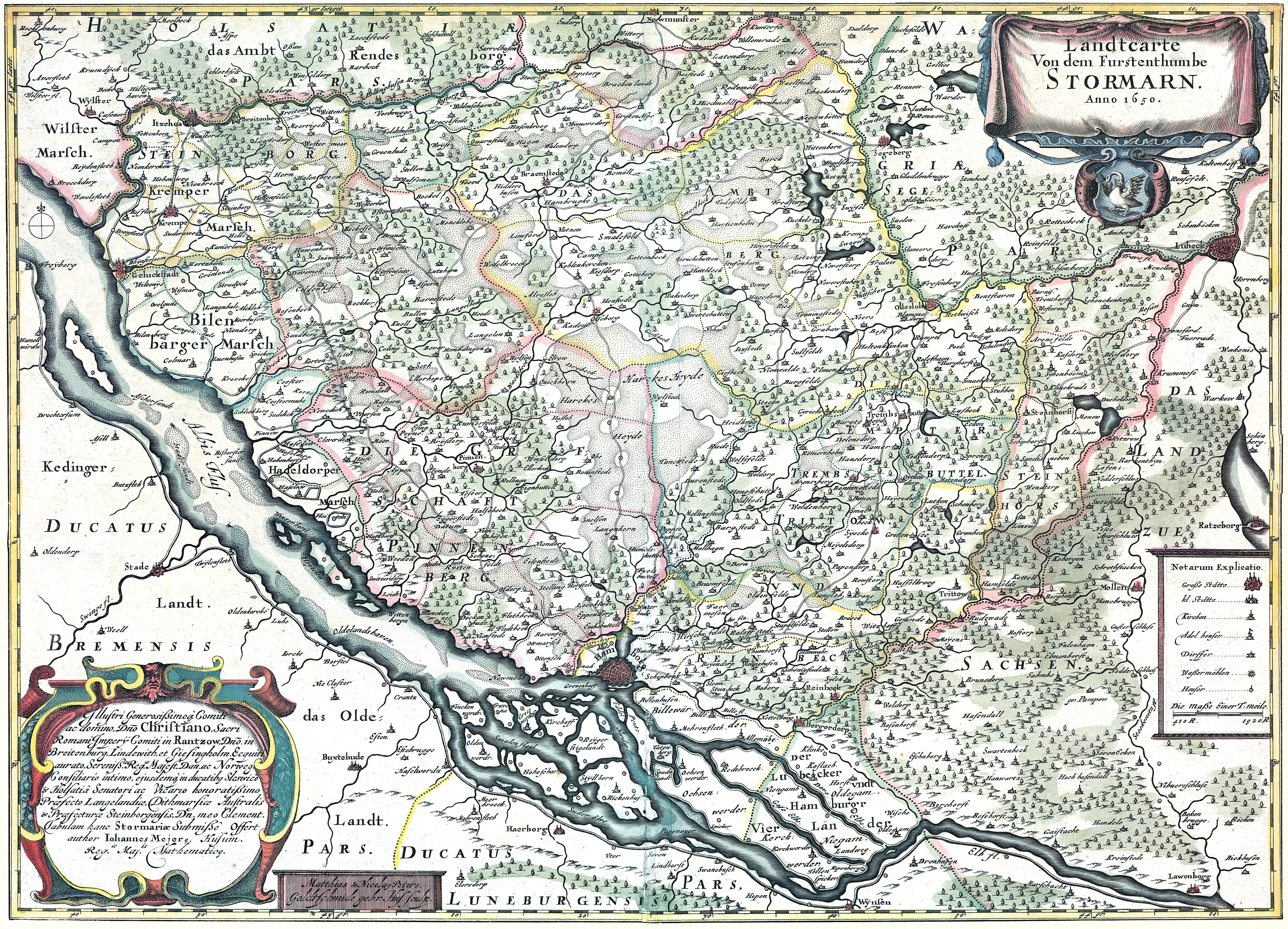
Map of the Principality of Stormarn, 1650 by J. Mejer

Mejer was the son of a pastor from Husum with the same name. His mother, Elisabeth Jüngling, was the daughter of the organist Johannes Jüngling (1522–1627) from Bovenau. His exact date of birth is unknown; he was baptized on October 12, 1606.

The early death of his father in 1617 left the family in poverty. With the support of his uncle Bernhard Mejer, he studied mathematics and astronomy in Copenhagen. At the university, he learned the fundamentals of cartography practiced there since Tycho Brahe. After returning to Husum around 1629, Mejer worked as a teacher, occasional poet, almanac maker, and cartographer. In 1635 and 1636, Mejer worked for Duke Friedrich III, Duke of Holstein-Gottorp. With the duke's support, he undertook a study trip to Holland in 1637. Under the commission of the duke, Mejer completed an atlas of Apenrade Amthouse in 1641. He received support from Joachim Danckwerth, the Apenrade Amthouse administrator. Successful in mapping the Schlei with its herring weirs, two copies of the Schlei Atlas containing 40 and 43 maps are preserved. One is located in the Schleswig-Holstein State Archive, while the other is in the Royal Library in Copenhagen. In 1639, Mejer drew what is likely the oldest usable map of Heligoland Island, Nova Tabula Helgolandiae.

In 1647, Christian IV of Denmark appointed Mejer as the royal mathematician. The Danish king commissioned Mejer to survey the west coast of Schleswig-Holstein first. A pamphlet titled Nordfriesland – früher und heute states: "These two maps of Nordfriesland from the years 1240 and 1634 are by the Husum cartographer Johannes Meyer. He created these maps in 1649. For the production of these drawings and their outlines, he must have had accurate materials."

In 1652, Caspar Danckwerth published his New Description of the Two Duchies of Schleswig and Holstein with 40 maps and city plans by Mejer. Danckwerth's land description was modeled after Willem Janszoon Blaeu's Novus Atlas, published in 1645. Most of Mejer's maps were artistically embellished by the brothers Mathias and Nicolaus Petersen and engraved on copper plates by Andreas and Christian Lorenzen, known as "Rodtgießer." Mejer's maps of the duchies of Schleswig and Holstein served as a basis for renowned cartographers and publishers (Janssonius, Visscher, Schenk, Homann, Seutter, Lotter, and others) for decades. However, Mejer could not financially benefit from this because Danckwerth's widow sold the copper plates to the Dutch publisher Joan Blaeu in 1657 and withheld Mejer's share of the profits.

Mejer felt lifelong commitment to the great Danish astronomer Tycho Brahe. He adopted Brahe's world model and had a representation of it engraved in copper in 1651.

He died at the beginning of June 1674 and was buried on June 10.

His estate is preserved in the Royal Library in Copenhagen.

== Publications ==
- Kurt Domeier: Die Landkarten von Johannes Mejer, Husum, aus der neuen Landesbeschreibung der zwei Herzogtümer Schleswig und Holstein von Caspar Danckwerth 1652. Heinevetter, Hamburg-Bergedorf 1963.
- Henning Ratjen: Johann Mejer und Caspar Danckwerth In: Volksbuch auf das Jahr 1846 für die Herzogthümer Schleswig-Holstein und Lauenburg Publisher of the expedition of the Altona Mercury, Altona 1846.
- Dagmar Unverhau: Der Schleiatlas von Johannes Mejer (1641) In: Kartographiehistorisches Colloquium Lüneburg 84, Berlin 1985, S. 103–124.
- Dagmar Unverhau: Der Schleiatlas von Joh. Mejer (1641) – Kartengeschichtliches Kleinod des Landesarchivs. In: Die Heimat. Zeitschrift für Natur- und Landeskunde von Schleswig-Holstein und Hamburg. Bd. 93 (1986), Nr. 2, Februar, S. 45–64 (scans).
- Georg Hille (1885). "Mejer, Johannes". Allgemeine Deutsche Biographie (in German). Vol. 21. Leipzig: Duncker & Humblot. pp. 200–202.
- Dieter Lohmeier: Mejer, Johannes. In: Olaf Klose, Eva Rudolph (Hrsg.): Schleswig-Holsteinisches Biographisches Lexikon. Bd. 4. Karl Wachholtz Verlag, Neumünster 1976, S. 147–150.
- Oswald Dreyer-Eimbcke: 400 Jahre Johannes Mejer – Der große Kartograph aus Husum (1606–1674) Komregis-Verlag, Oldenburg 2006, ISBN 978-3-938501-12-2.

== Links ==
- Literature by and about Johannes Mejer in the German National Library catalogue
- P. Lauridsen: Kartografen Johannes Mejer. In: Historisk Tidsskrift Bind 6. række, 1 (1887–1888) 1 (Danish, archived on archive.org).
