= Hermann Tast School =

German grammar school in Schleswig-Holstein (founded in 1527)

- Hermann-Tast-Schule
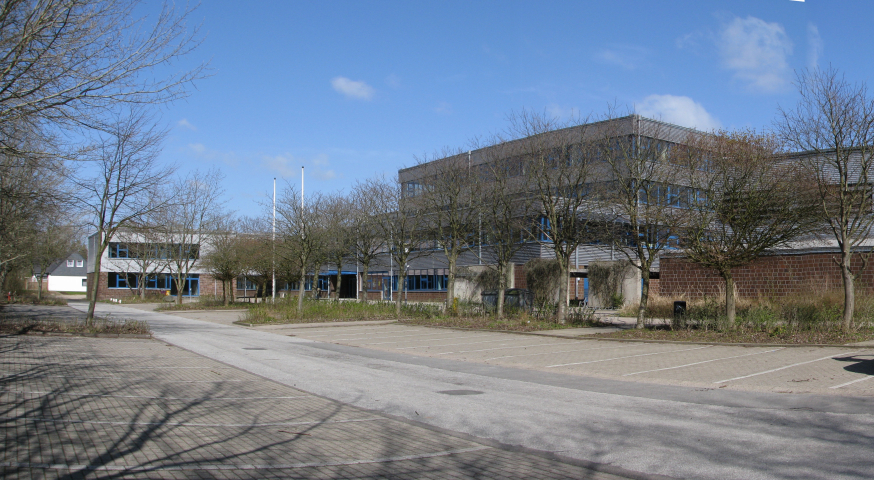
- Hermann-Tast-Schule (HTS)

Location
- Am Bahndamm 1, 25813 Husum; Husum, Schleswig-Holstein; Germany; 54°28′22″N 9°3′38″E

Information
- Former name: Husum Grammar School (German:Husumer Gelehrtenschule)
- Established: 1527
- Principal: Renate Christiansen
- Staff: 90
- Enrollment: ca. 1200
- Website: https://hermann-tast-schule.lernnetz.de/

The Hermann Tast School (German:Hermann-Tast-Schule) is a humanistic high school in Husum. It was founded in 1527 and named after the theologian Hermann Tast (1490–1551), who was born in Husum. Before 1914, it was called the Husum Grammar School (German:Husumer Gelehrtenschule).

== History ==
The school was founded when Husum was still part of Denmark. The initiative for the Husum Grammar School, the predecessor of today's Hermann Tast School, came from the Reformation leader Hermann Tast and his supporter, the rich Husum merchant Matthias Knutzen, in whose private house the lessons were initially held by a teacher. It was not until 1533, when several donations were made by the Danish king Frederick I of Denmark, that there was enough money for a second teacher.

The first school building was built on Süderstrasse in 1586. From the very beginning, this building was designed to be so spacious that students could be taught in it for almost 300 years. This building was demolished in 1876. It was located next to St. Mary's Church on the corner of Süderstrasse. After the end of the Second Schleswig War in 1867, southern Schleswig, including the city of Husum, became part of the Schleswig-Holstein province of Prussia. The school moved into a new building. A building was later built on Süderstrasse that was the home of students until 1974. This building, which was subsequently used as a secondary school, is now a five-star luxury hotel (Hotel Altes Gymnasium). During the summer holidays in 1974, the school moved to the current Am Bahndamm building.

== School program ==
The Hermann Tast School is an open all-day school. In a new school program launched in 2004, a mission statement was developed which is intended to express the following pedagogical self-image. First and foremost, the educational goal is to strengthen the students' personal development through in-depth general education. The school feels obliged to promote the cultivation of this tradition (including the ancient languages), also with regard to the centuries-old tradition. The school therefore has an ancient language branch with Latin as the first foreign language and the possibility of taking Greek as an elective subject. Another focus, especially in the extracurricular area, is seen in an opening towards the environmental area. This orientation finds its expression, among other things, in a business internship and in various excursions.
