= Theodor-Storm-Haus =

Literary museum in Husum, Schleswig-Holstein, Germany

Coordinates: 54.475656°N 9.047656°E

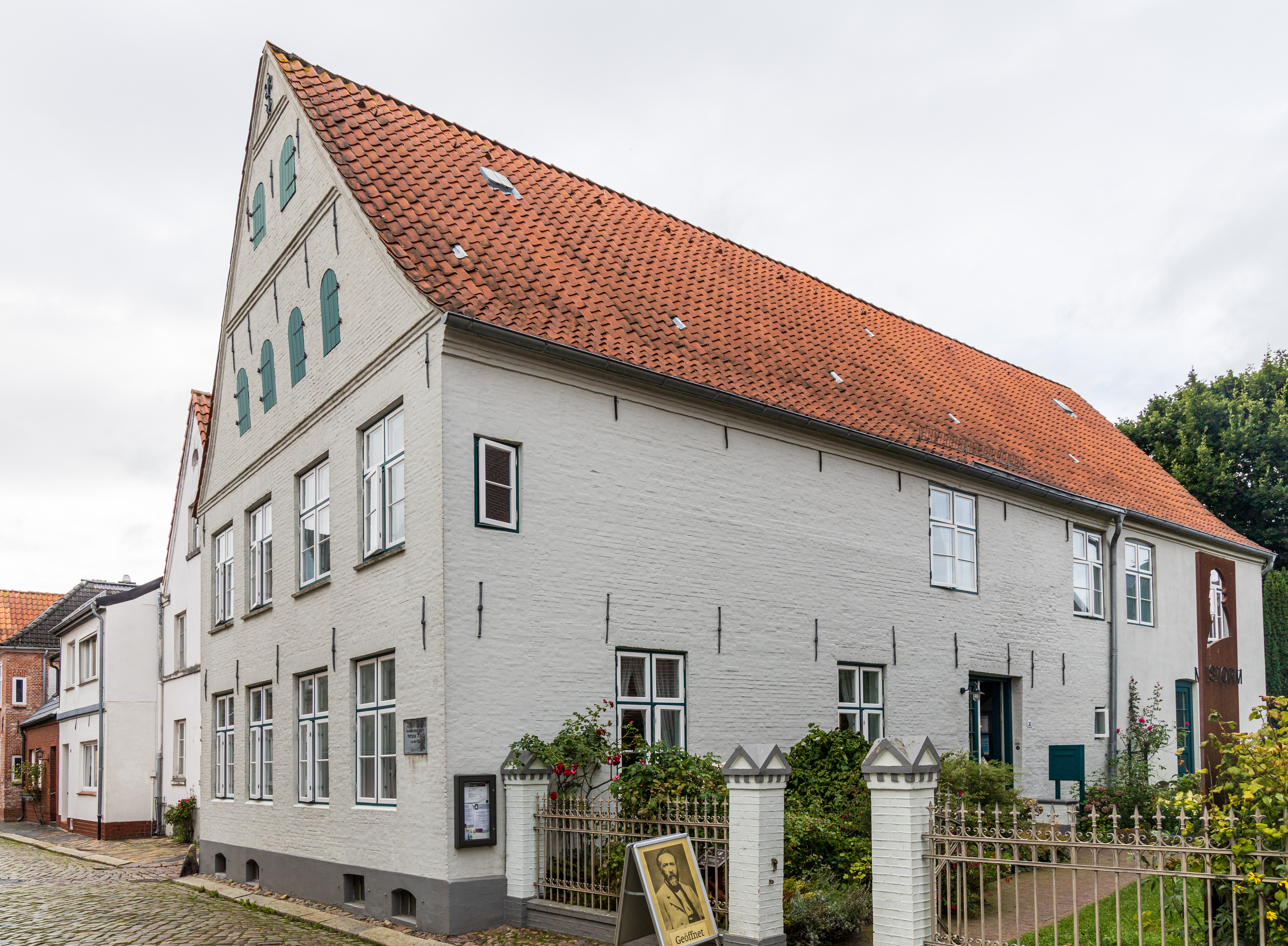
The Theodor-Storm-Haus

The Theodor-Storm-Haus (Theodor-Storm-Museum, Storm Center) in Husum, Schleswig-Holstein, Germany, is a literature museum dedicated to the poet and writer Theodor Storm, who lived there from 1866 to 1880.

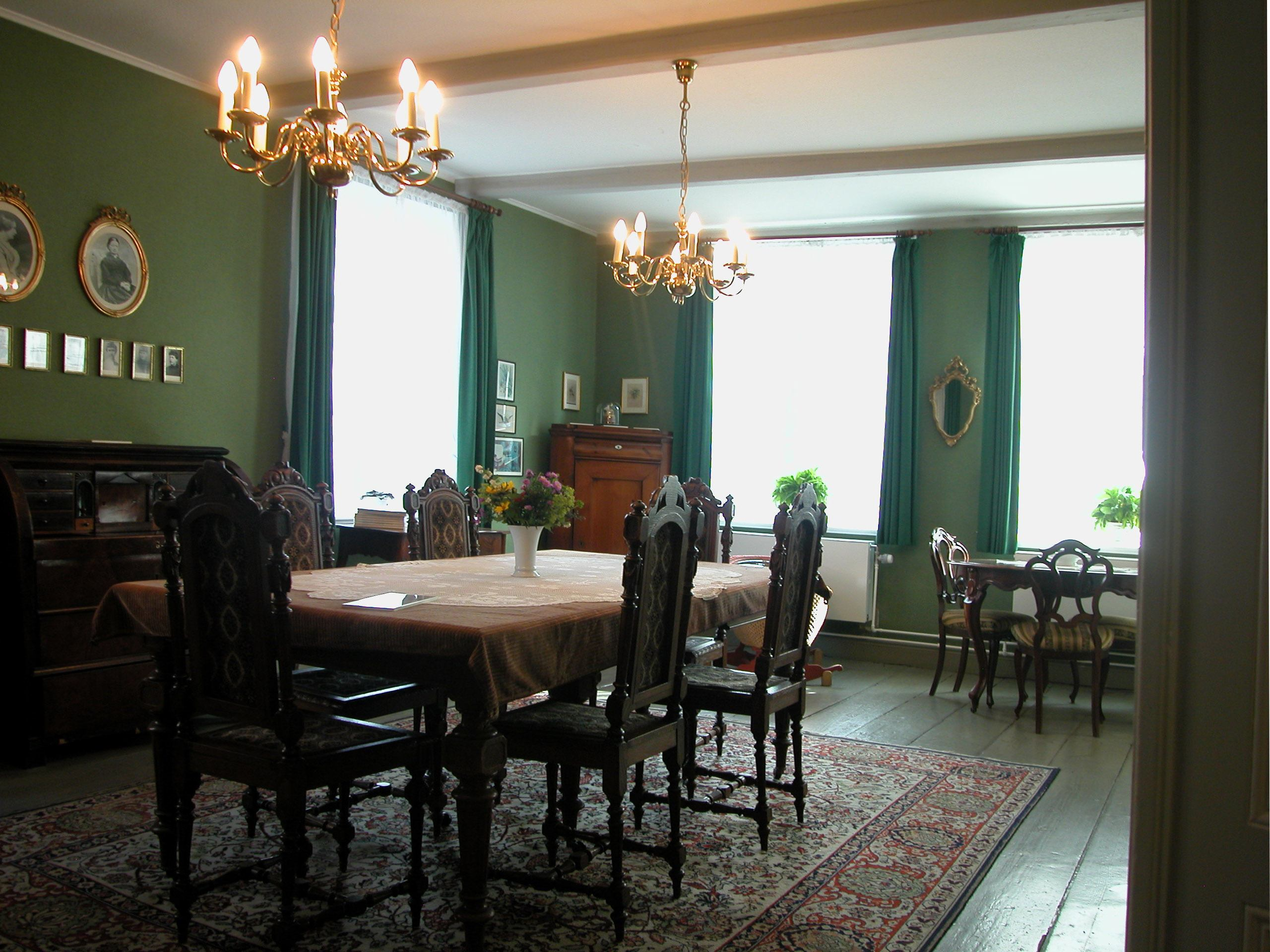
Living room furniture

On the ground floor of the house at Wasserreihe 31 are the former Landvogtei and Storm's study, while on the upper floor is the so-called Geschirrstube or china room, with old table porcelain. Adjacent to this, pictures and objects owned by the poet and his circle of acquaintances are on display. The living room is approximately in the condition it was during Storm's lifetime, and the so-called Hademarschen Room is a memorial to the last period of the poet's life. The remaining rooms contain a scholarly library and an archive that are used for research projects by the Storm Society.

The Theodor Storm Society is headquartered at the Storm-Haus.

The institution has been led by Christian Demandt since 2011.
