= Jürgen Freiwald =

German volleyball player (1940–2014)

Personal information
- Nationality: German
- Born: 9 September 1940 Husum, Germany
- Died: 11 February 2014 (aged 73)

Sport
- Sport: Volleyball

Jürgen Freiwald (9 September 1940 – 11 February 2014) was a German volleyball player who competed in the men's tournament at the 1968 Summer Olympics.
