= Matthias Holst =

German footballer

Personal information
- Full name: Matthias Holst
- Date of birth: 19 June 1982 (age 44)
- Place of birth: Husum, West Germany
- Height: 1.89 m (6 ft 2 in)
- Position: Defender

Team information
- Current team: Rödemisser SV

Youth career
- SV Rödemis
- TSV Bredstedt
- –1999: Heider SV

Senior career*
Years	Team	Apps	(Gls)
1999–2003	Hamburger SV (A)	21	(0)
2003–2005	F.C. Hansa Rostock (A)	49	(4)
2005–2008	FC Rot-Weiß Erfurt	93	(3)
2008–2010	SC Paderborn 07	47	(2)
2010–2013	F.C. Hansa Rostock	58	(3)
2014–	Rödemisser SV		
- * Club domestic league appearances and goals

Matthias Holst (born 19 June 1982 in Husum) is a German footballer who currently plays for Rödemisser SV.
