= Joachim Friedrich Quack =

German Egyptologist and Demotic Language specialist (born 1966)

Joachim Friedrich Quack (born 10 June 1966 in Husum, Schleswig-Holstein) is a German Egyptologist and Demotic Language specialist.

== Education ==
He studied Egyptology, Semitic and Biblical Archaeology at the University of Tübingen and abroad at the École pratique des hautes études and Collège de France in Paris 1990 where he graduated with a Master's degree and "very good with distinction".

In the years 1991–1993 he worked on his dissertation on The Teachings of Ani and received a doctoral scholarship from the German National Academic Foundation associated with a trip to Copenhagen. Joachim Friedrich Quack began studies in 1991 for a second degree in Ancient Near Eastern Studies and Pre-and Early History.

In 1991 he took part in an excavation in northern Jordan for the Biblical Archaeological Institute in Tübingen Khirbet ez-Zeraqon. In 1994 he received a teaching assignment for "Egyptian Magic" at the Eberhard Karls University of Tübingen, and in 1995 with members of the International Committee for publishing the Carlsberg Papyri in Copenhagen. During this time he held a one-semester course "Introduction to Demotic" for the German Research Foundation. In 1996, he received a research grant for the reconstruction of the Book of the Temple.

From 1997 he worked as a Researcher for an Egyptological Seminar of the Free University of Berlin. He won the 2002 Lectureship for "Introduction to Middle Egyptian language and writing I" and on 12 February 2003 his habilitation thesis "Contributions to the Egyptian deans and its reception in the Greco-Roman world (FU Berlin 2002)" Since 2005 JF Quack has been professor of Egyptology in Heidelberg.

== Awards and Grants ==
- 1 May 2002 – 30 April 2003: Scholarship of the Kalkhof Rose Foundation
- 2003 – 31 March 2005: Heisenberg scholarship
- 2009: elected a full member of the Philosophy and History class at the Heidelberg Academy of Sciences
- 2011: Gottfried Wilhelm Leibniz Prize of German Research Foundation

== Publications ==
Below is a selection of publications.

Monographs and series

- J. Quack, F. Hoffmann Anthology of demotic literature Lit Verlag Münster, 2007.
- The demotic and Greco-Egyptian Literature (introduction to ancient Egyptian literature History 3), Lit, Münster, 2005
- Studies for teaching Merikare In Göttingen Orient research series IV Egypt (GOF IV) Vol 23, Wiesbaden, Germany in 1992

Magazine

- Les mages égyptianisés? Remarks on some surprising points in supposedly magusean writings in:Journal of Near Eastern Studies 65, University of Chicago Press, Chicago, 2006, pp. 267–282.
