= Michel Deckmann =

German politician (born 1996)

Member of the Landtag of Schleswig-Holstein
- Incumbent
- Assumed office 7 June 2022
- Preceded by: Klaus Jensen
- Constituency: Nordfriesland-Süd

Personal details
- Born: 27 December 1996 (age 29) Husum
- Party: Christian Democratic Union

Michel Deckmann (born 27 December 1996 in Husum) is a German politician serving as a member of the Landtag of Schleswig-Holstein since 2022. He has been a district councillor of Nordfriesland since 2018.
