= Charlotte Christiane von Krogh =

Danish painter

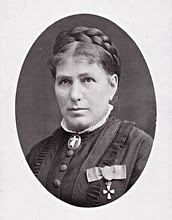
- Born: Charlotte Sofie Christiane Rosine von Krogh; 1827; Husum, Duchy of Schleswig; Southern Jutland; Kingdom of Denmark
- Died: 1913 (aged 85–86); Haderslev, Region of Southern Denmark; Kingdom of Denmark
- Noble family: Krogh
- Father: Godske Hans Ernst von Krogh
- Mother: Agnes Cecilie Wilhelmine von Warnstedt
- Occupation: painter

Charlotte Sofie Christiane Rosine von Krogh (1827–1913) was a Danish painter who studied in Denmark and Germany. She first exhibited in Kiel in 1857. Painting both landscapes and interiors, she depicted scenes in and around Haderslev and on the island of Fanø. Her works can be seen in the collections of museums in Southern Jutland and Flensborg and in Gottorf Castle.

== Biography ==
Charlotte Christiane Rosine Sophie von Krogh was born on 4 February 1827 in Husum in the Duchy of Schleswig. She was the youngest daughter of Godske Hans Ernst von Krogh (1778–1852), a Danish nobleman, military officer, and high-ranking official, and Agnes Cecilie Wilhelmine von Warnstedt (1788–1829), a German noblewoman. In 1848, concerned by the rise of the provisional government of Schlesig-Holstein, Godske von Krogh left Husum and moved with Charlotte to the Danish town of Haderslev in Southern Jutland.

Throughout her life, Christiane von Krogh was firmly attached to both Denmark and Germany. She was educated at Gisselfeld Convent, a girls school near Haslev, and while still young was introduced to painting by the Haderslev landscape painter Anton Eduard Kieldrup (1826–1869). She then spent a lengthy period in Germany, studying under the Norwegian painter Hans Fredrik Gude (1825–1903) in Düsseldorf. Thanks to Gude, she presented her work at a solo exhibition in Kiel. She also studied at the art academies in Karlsruhe and Berlin, a quite unusual occurrence for women at the time.

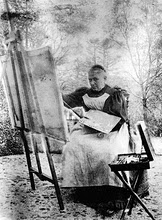
Charlotte von Krogh (c.1890)

In 1861, she returned to Haderslev where she bought a house on Laurids Skaus Gade. In an attached building, she established her studio. For many years, she lived together with her friend, the pianist Marie Roll. She helped two young artists, Hans Fuglsang and August Wilckens develop as painters.

In 1904, she spent some time on the island of Fanø where her paintings included depictions of Fanø Church.

Charlotte von Krogh died in Haderslev on 25 November 1913. Although at the time the town was German, her funeral service was conducted in Danish. Many artists from the region were present.

== Gallery ==
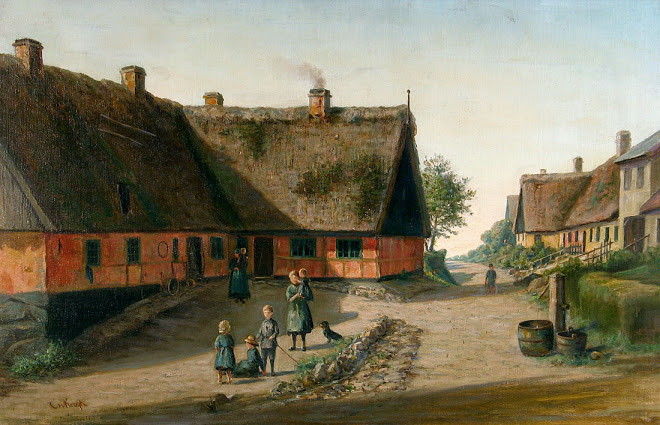
Armenhaus-Nordschleswig

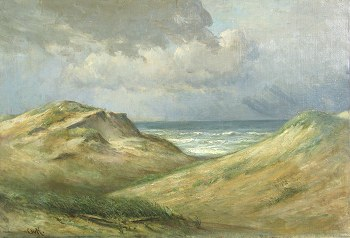
Kroghklitlandskab

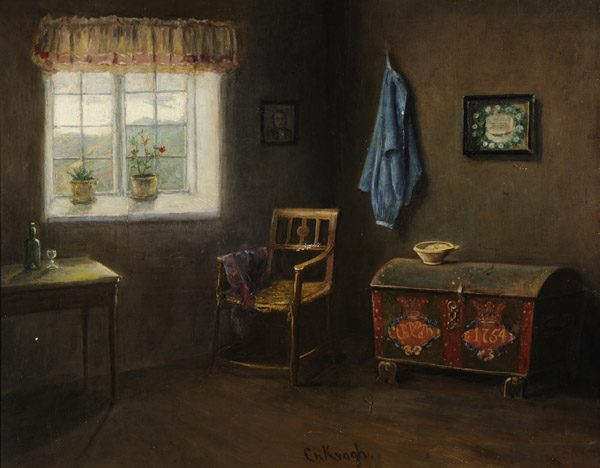
Stube auf einer Nordseeinsel
