= Bay of Husum =

Coordinates: 54.476°N 8.965°E

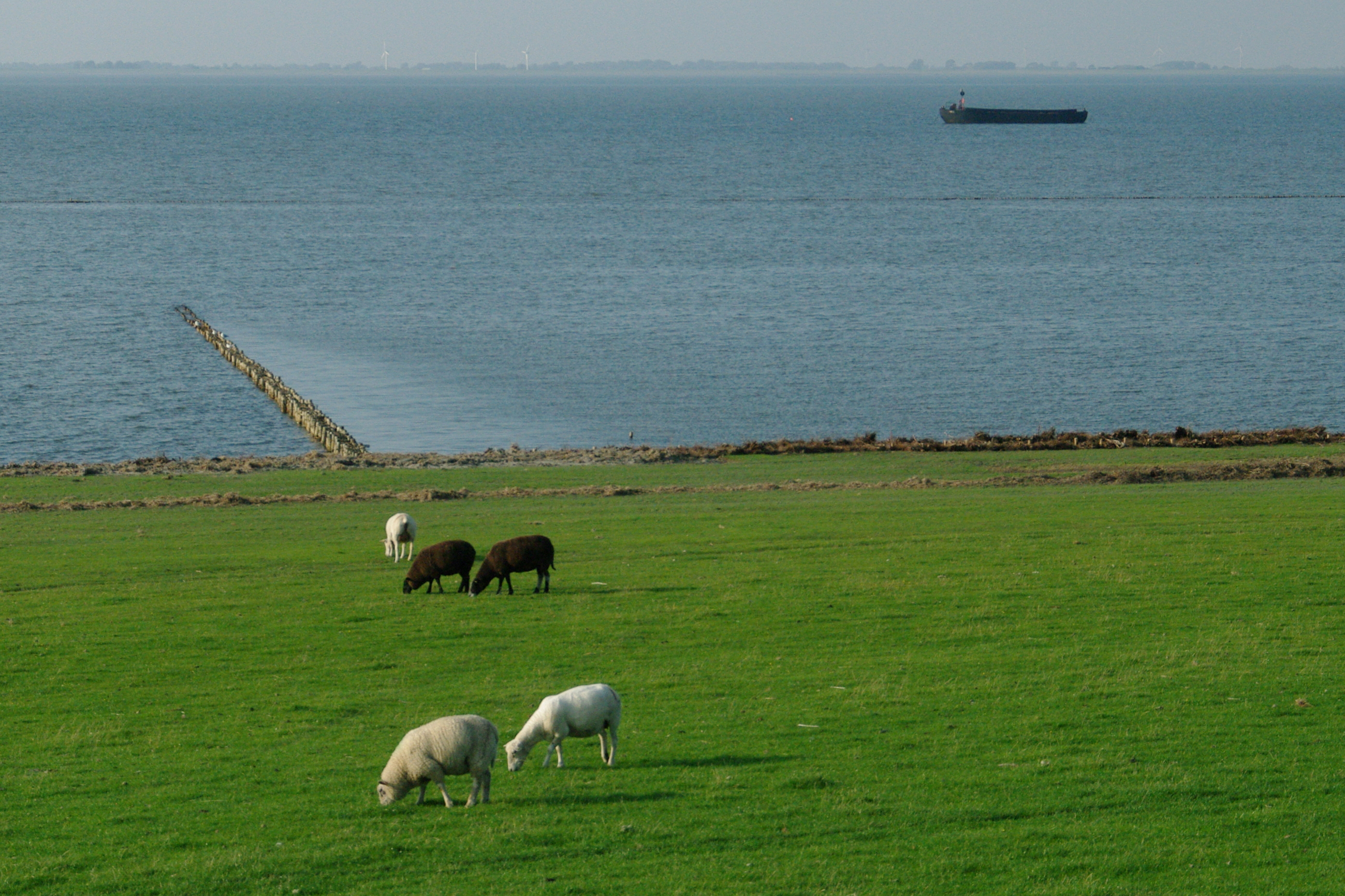
View over the bay from Eiderstedt looking north.

The Bay of Husum, Husum Bight or Husum Bay (German: Husumer Bucht) is a bay on the North Sea coast of the German state of Schleswig-Holstein. Its German name is used for marketing the holiday region around the town of Husum.

The bight is part of the Schleswig-Holstein Wadden Sea National Park and is a UNESCO World Heritage Site.

== Location ==
In the south of Husum Bay is the peninsula of Eiderstedt, in the north is the Schobüll Geest. The geest is adjoined by the peninsula of Nordstrand, and linked by the Adler Express ferry via Hallig Hooge with the island of Sylt. In the east is the riparian landscape of the rivers Eider, Treene and Sorge. Well known settlements are Husum and its surrounding villages as far as the Südermarsch.

== Fauna ==
The Wadden Sea provides migrating birds with shelter and is home to various species of white fish, perch, pike, carp, asp, tench, catfish and zander. The land around the bay is grazed by sheep and goats, the natural lawn mowers on the dykes.
