= Husum =

- Town
- Husum - Old harbour

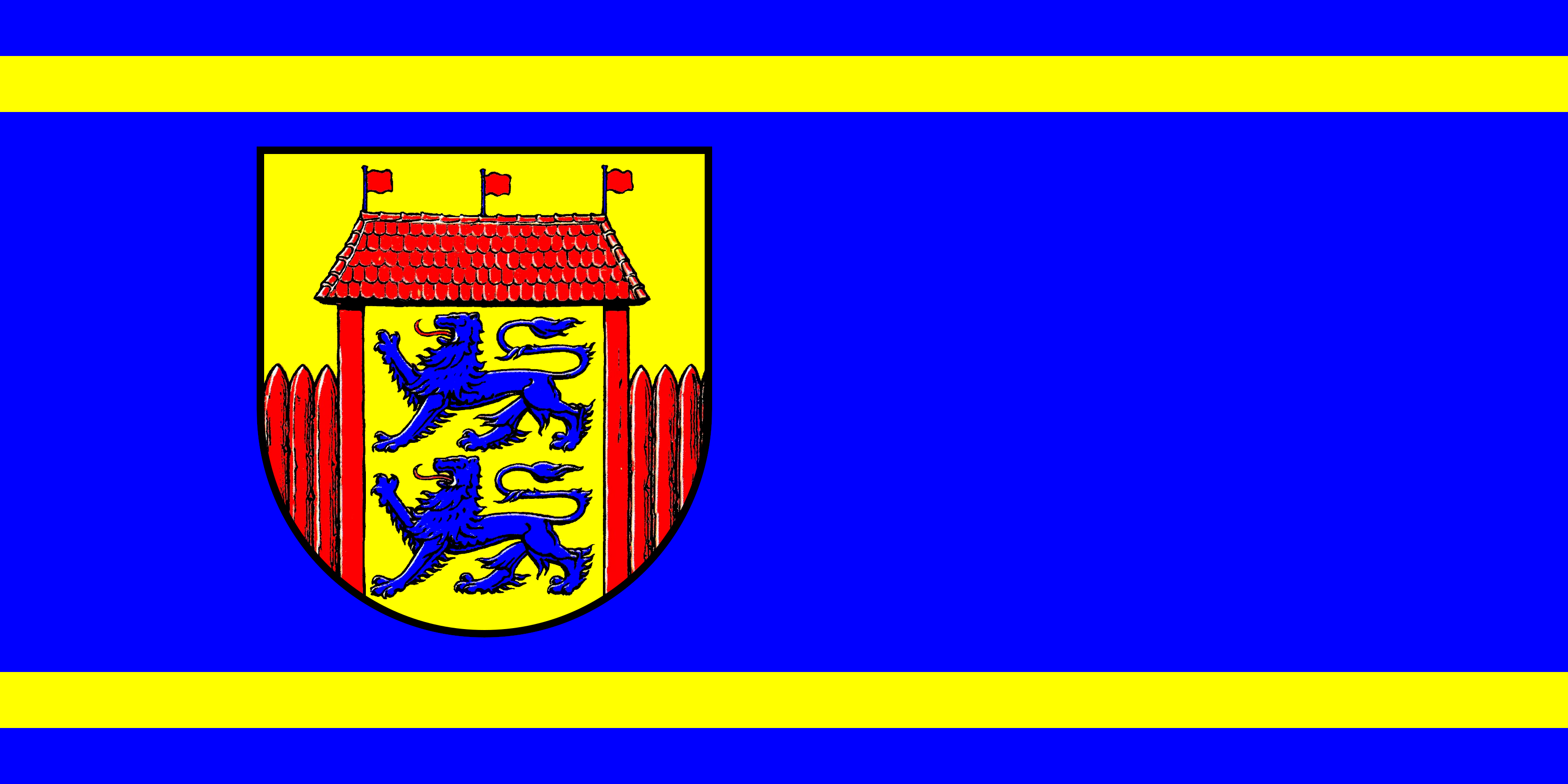
- Flag Coat of arms

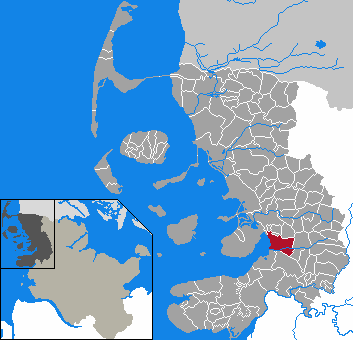
- Location of Husum within Nordfriesland district
- Interactive map of Husum
- Location within Germany Location within Schleswig-Holstein
- Coordinates: 54°28′N 9°3′E
- Country: Germany
- State: Schleswig-Holstein
- District: Nordfriesland

Government
  - Mayor: Martin Kindl (CDU)

Area
  - Total: 25.8 km^{2} (10.0 sq mi)
- Elevation: 14 m (46 ft)

Population (2025-12-31)
  - Total: 23,976
  - Density: 929/km^{2} (2,410/sq mi)
- Time zone: UTC+01:00 (CET)
  - Summer (DST): UTC+02:00 (CEST)
- Postal codes: 25813
- Dialling codes: 04841
- Vehicle registration: NF
- Website: husum.de

Husum (German pronunciation: [ˈhuːzʊm]; North Frisian: Hüsem) is the capital of the Kreis (district) Nordfriesland in Schleswig-Holstein, Germany. The town was the birthplace of the novelist Theodor Storm, who coined the epithet "the grey town by the sea". It is also the home of the annual international piano festival Raritäten der Klaviermusik founded in 1987.

== History ==
Husum was first mentioned as Husembro in 1252, when king Abel was murdered.

Like most towns on the North Sea, Husum was strongly influenced by storm tides. In 1362 a disastrous storm tide, the "Grote Mandrenke" flooded the town and carved out the inland harbour. Before this date Husum was not situated directly on the coast. The people of the city took advantage of this opportunity and built a marketplace, which led to a great economic upturn.

Between 1372 and 1398 the population of Husum grew rapidly, and two villages, Oster-Husum (East-Husum) and Wester-Husum (West-Husum), were founded.

The name Husum is first mentioned in 1409. It is shown on the Carta Marina in the Frisian form of Husem.

Its first church was built in 1431. Wisby rights were granted it in 1582, and in 1603 it received municipal privileges from Alexander, Duke of Schleswig-Holstein-Sonderburg. It suffered greatly from inundations in 1634 and 1717.

== Geography ==
Husum is located on the Wadden Sea, in the southeast of the North Sea, by the Bay of Husum; 82 km W of Kiel, 139 km NW of Hamburg and 43 km SW of Flensburg.

=== Subdivisions ===
- Zentrum (Danish: Indreby)
- Nordhusum (Danish: Nørre Husum)
- Porrenkoog (Danish: Porrekog, North Frisian: Porekuuch)
- Osterhusum (Danish: Øster Husum), Osterhusumfeld
- Altstadt
- Norderschlag (Danish: Nørreslag)
- Dreimühlen (Danish: Tremølle)
- Rödemis (Danish: Rødemis, North Frisian: Rööms)
- Fischersiedlung
- Neustadt (Danish: Nystad(en))
- Gewerbegebiet
- Schauendahl (Danish: Skovdal)
- Kielsburg (Danish: Kilsborg)
- Rosenburg
- Schobüll (Danish: Skobøl, North Frisian: Schööbel)
- Halebüll (Danish: Halebøl, North Frisian: Hälbel)
- Hockensbüll (Danish: Hokkensbøl, North Frisian: Hukensbel)
- Lund

== Culture ==
Renaissance buildidngs in Hohle Gasse Lane

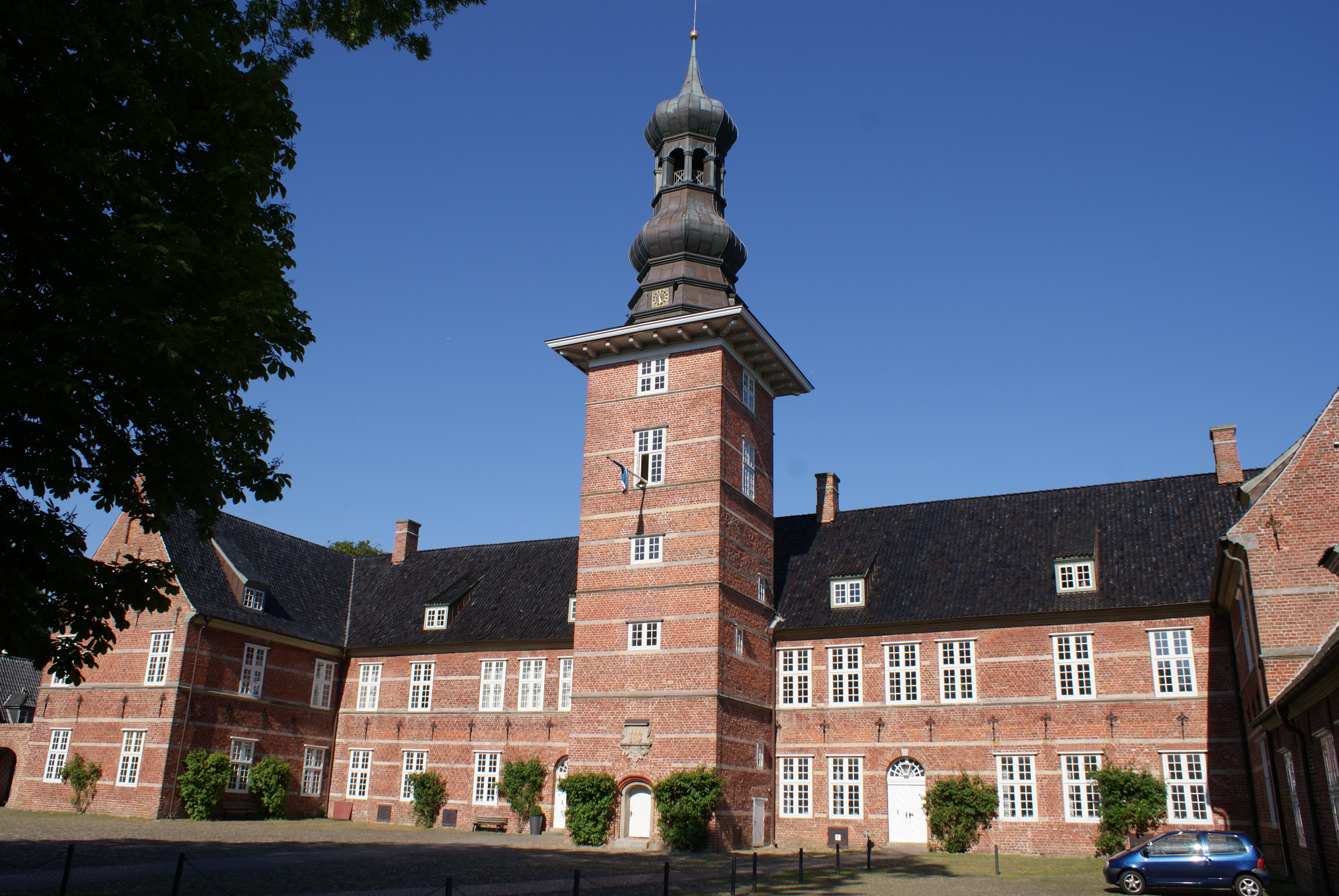
Schloss vor Husum

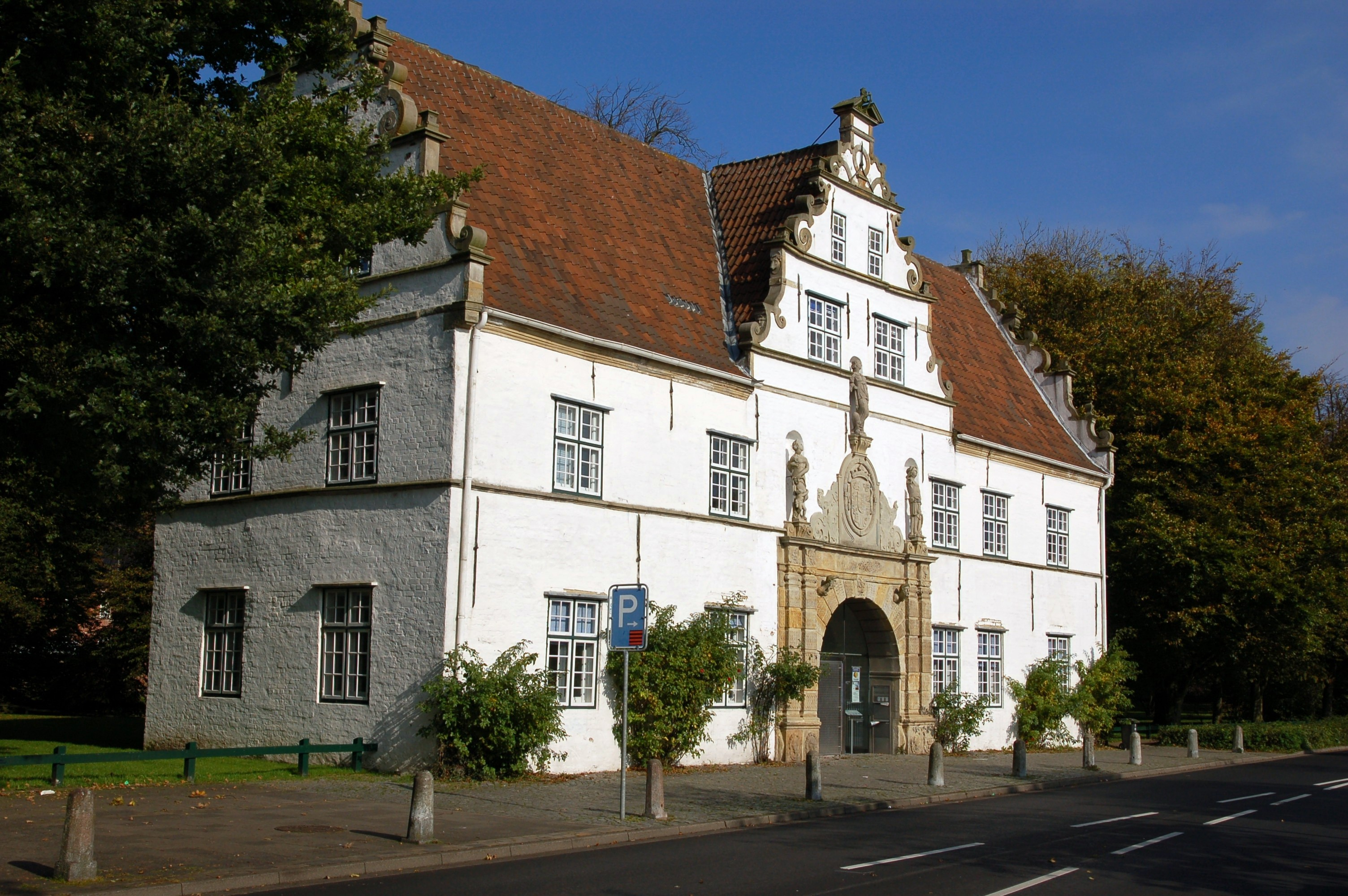
Gate house dating from 1612

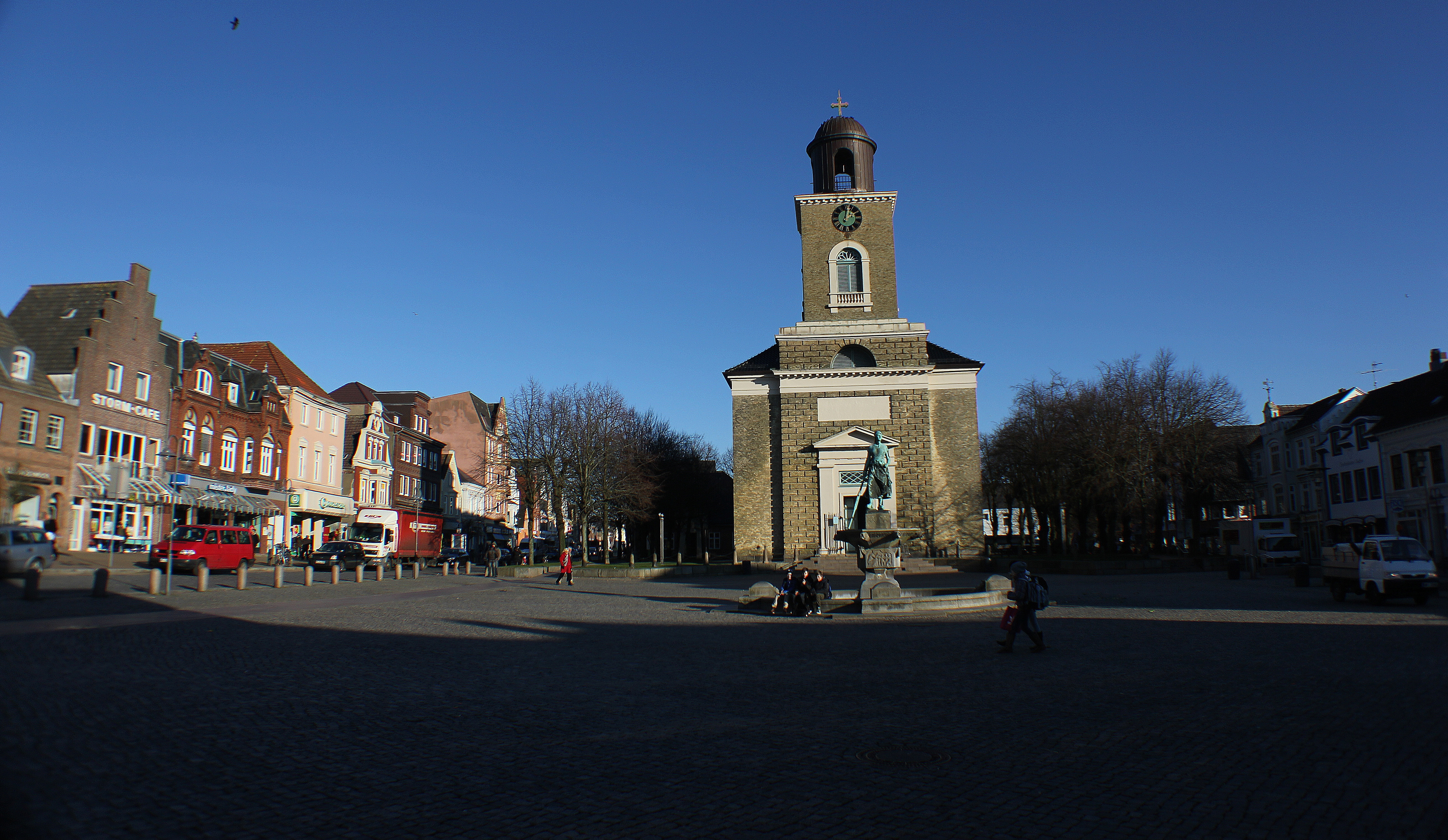
Market of Husum with the church (Marienkirche) and the Tine-Well

Being a tourist resort and the gateway to the North Frisian Islands, Husum offers many cultural features.

=== Festival Raritäten der Klaviermusik ===
The Raritäten der Klaviermusik international festival of rare piano music, specialising in unknown classical piano music, was founded in 1987 by Peter Froundjian, and takes place in the Schloss vor Husum.

=== Museums ===
The Theodor-Storm-Haus (Wasserreihe 31) was the house of Theodor Storm. It is home to an exhibition about the novelist and his works. The Schiffahrtsmuseum Nordfriesland (Zingel 15) shows ships from the Middle Ages to the present. The models on display give a good impression of life on the coast and at sea. The Ostenfelder Bauernhaus (Nordhusumer Str.13) is an old farmhouse and the oldest open-air museum in Germany.

=== Sights ===
- Marienkirche, Husum, dismantled 1807, rebuilt 1833 by Danish architects in the Neoclassical style
- The Schloss vor Husum, completed in 1582, was a residence of the dukes of Holstein-Gottorp Its gate house dates from 1612.
- Birthplace and grave of Theodor Storm
- Well-preserved historical town center with merchants houses in the style of the Renaissance
- Old Town Hall, 1601
- New Town Hall, 1988/1989
- National Park House with an aquarium

=== Clubs ===
- The Spielmannszug & Jugendblasorchester Rödemis is a famous marching band from the district of Rödemis.

Husum is also home of two football clubs, the Husumer SV and the Rödemisser SV.

Husum Cricket Club is based at the Mikkelberg-Kunst-und-Cricket Center which has in the past hosted international women's cricket matches. The ground is located in nearby Hattstedt.

=== Twinning ===
Husum is twinned with:

Gentofte, Denmark; Heiligenstadt, Germany	(United Kingdom) Kidderminster, England; Trzcianka, Poland

== Infrastructure ==
Husum station is located on the Westerland–Hamburg line (Marsh Railway), the Husum–Bad St. Peter-Ording line to the Eiderstedt peninsula and the Husum–Jübek line, which connects to Kiel.

== Education ==
=== Grammar schools ===
- Hermann-Tast-Schule, humanistic grammar school since 1527, one of the oldest schools in the state of Schleswig-Holstein.
- Theodor-Storm-Schule

=== High schools ===
- Gemeinschaftsschule Husum-Nord
- Ferdinand-Tönnies-Schule
- Husum Danske Skole (Danish School)

=== Elementary schools ===
- Iven-Agßen-Schule, since 1619, one of the oldest elementary schools in Germany.
- Bürgerschule
- Klaus-Groth-Schule
- Bornschool in Schobüll

== Notable people ==
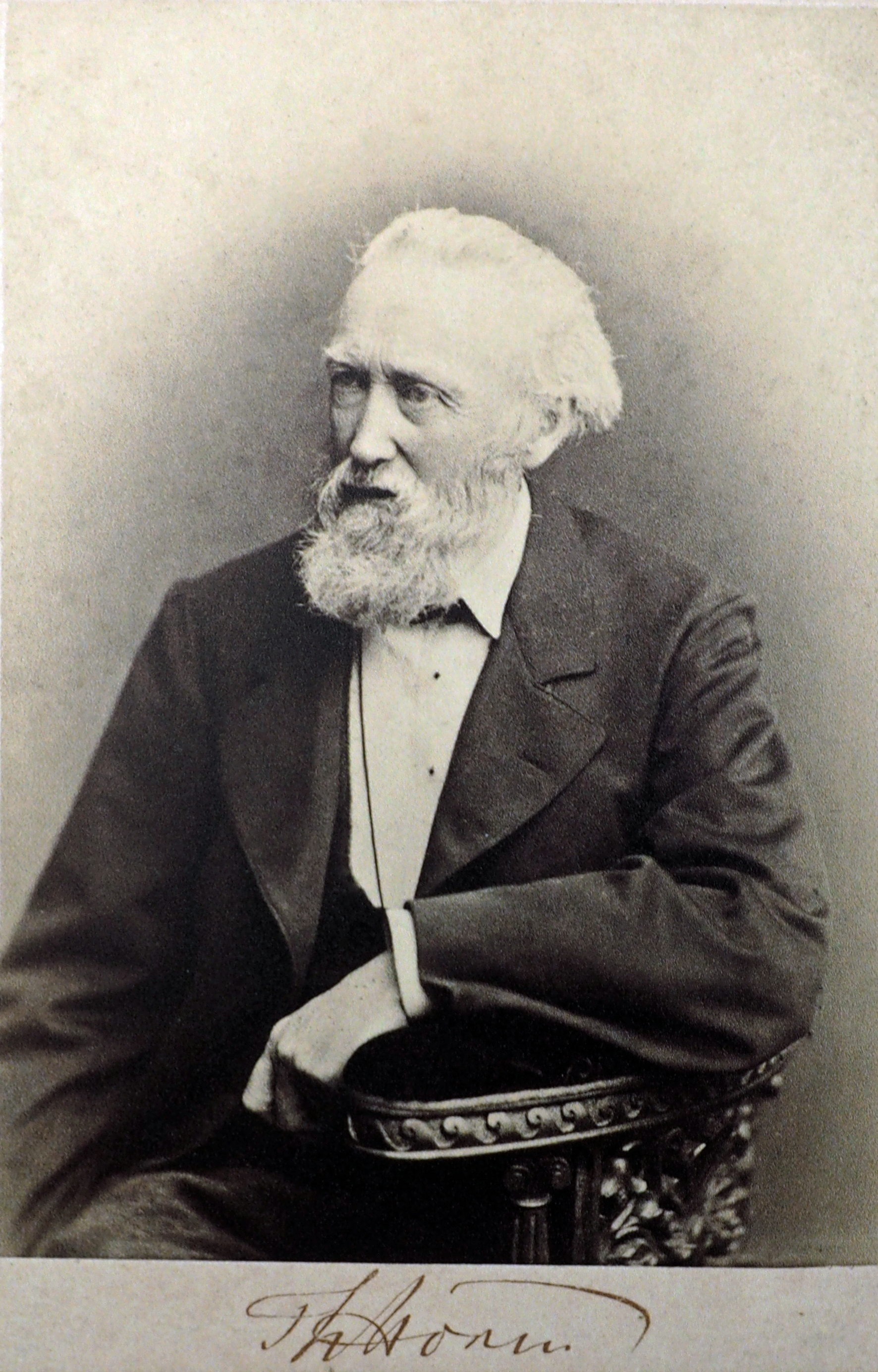
Theodor Storm (1817–1888)

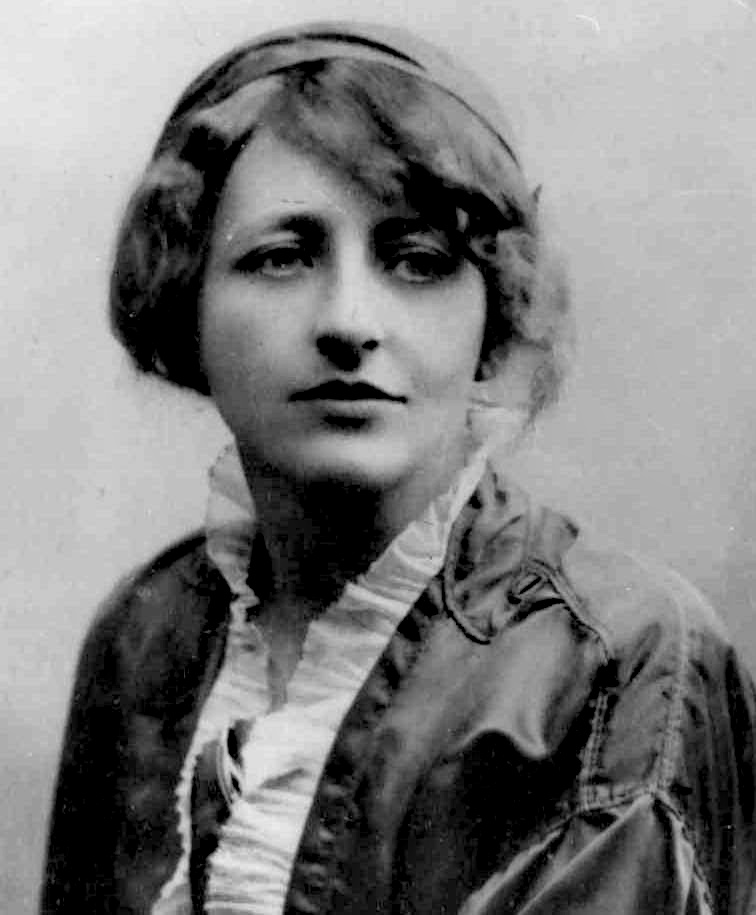
Fanny zu Reventlow

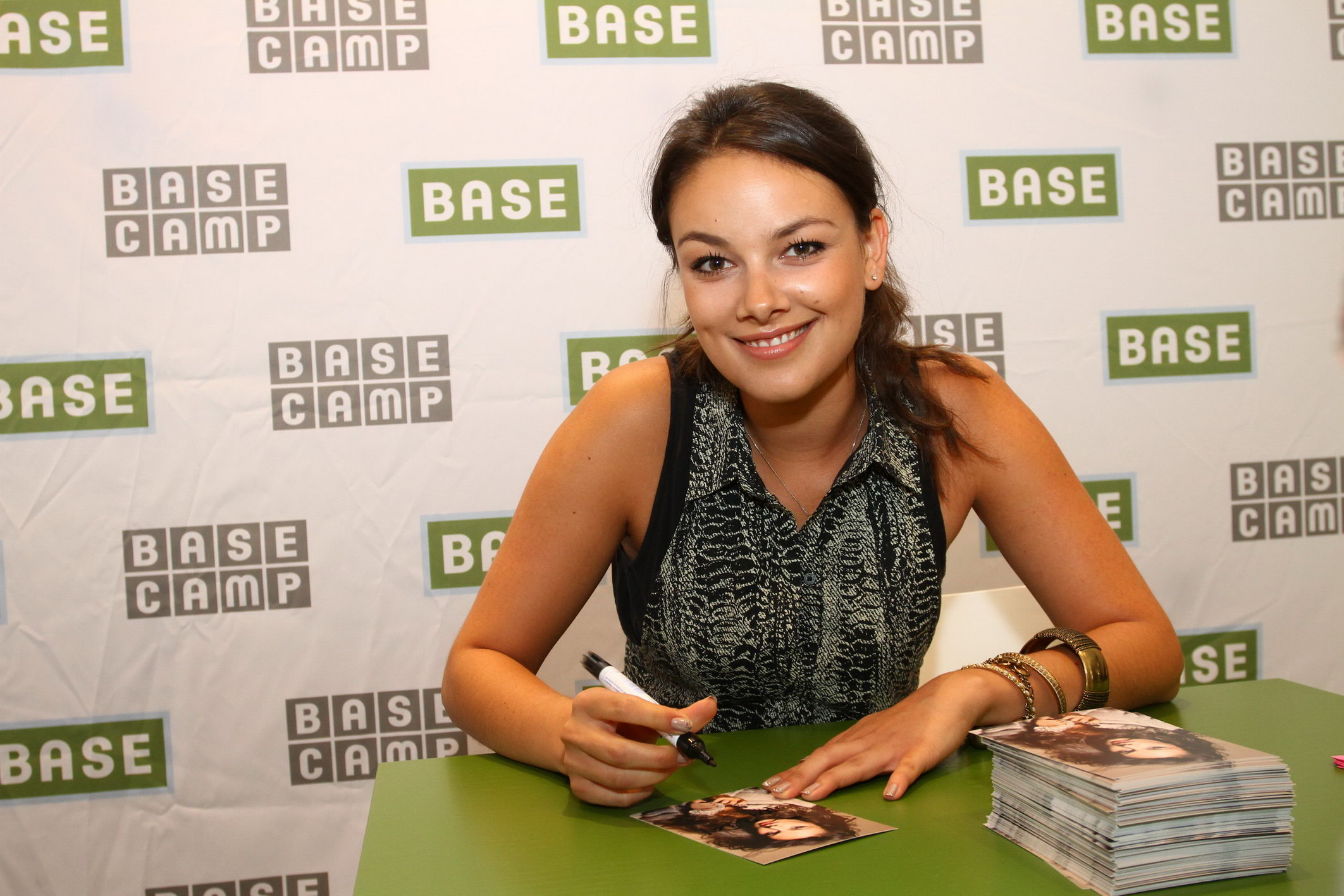
Janina Uhse, 2012

- Paul Würtz (1612–1676), German officer and diplomat; variously in German, Swedish, Danish and Dutch service.
- Nicolaus Bruhns (1665–1697), organist in Husum, 1689–1697, an important influence on Johann Sebastian Bach
- Johan Georg Forchhammer (1794–1865), mineralogist and geologist
- Peter Wilhelm Forchhammer (1801–1894), classical archaeologist.
- Georg Beseler (1809–1888), Prussian jurist and politician
- Friedrich Lübker (1811–1867), educator and philologist
- Theodor Storm (1817−1888), novelist of German realism style.
- Charlotte Christiane von Krogh (1827–1913), a Danish painter who studied in Denmark and Germany.
- Adolf Brütt (1855–1939), sculptor
- Ludwig Nissen (1855–1924), a gemstone dealer and philanthropist in Brooklyn; founded the Nordsee Museum
- Margarete Böhme (1867–1939), German writer
- Ernst Graf zu Reventlow (1869–1943), naval officer, journalist and Nazi politician
- Oskar Vogt (1870–1959), neuroanatomy, psychiatrist; he dissected the brain of Lenin in the 1920s
- Fanny zu Reventlow (1871–1918), painter and writer
- Claus-Frenz Claussen (born 1939), ENT-Medician, University teacher, author, editor, artist and inventor
- Hans Hartz (1943–2002), musician and songwriter
- Johann Wadephul (born 1963), CDU politician
- Dörte Hansen (born 1964), linguist, journalist and writer.
- Joachim Friedrich Quack (born 1966), Egyptologist and recipient of the Leibniz Prize
- Isgaard (born 1972), singer
- Jan Wayne (born 1974), electronic dance music DJ and producer
- Janina Uhse (born 1989), actress
- Michel Deckmann (born 1996), politician

=== Sport ===
- Jürgen Freiwald (1940–2014), volleyball player, competed at the 1968 Summer Olympics
- Herwig Ahrendsen (born 1948), handball player, competed in the 1972 Summer Olympics
- Lars Hartig (born 1990), rower, competed in the 2012 Summer Olympics
- Matthias Holst (born 1982), football player
- Morten Jensen (born 1987), football goalkeeper

== See also ==
- Schloss vor Husum

== Sources ==
- Riewerts, Brar V. (1969). Die Stadt Husum in Geschichte und Gegenwart (in German). Husum: Hermann Hansen.
- Brandt, Otto (1925). Geschichte Schleswig-Holsteins (8. Aufl. 1981) (in German). Kiel: Mühlau.
- "Husum". Allgemeine Deutsche Biographie (in German). Vol. 1. Leipzig: Duncker & Humblot. 1875. p. 707.
