= List of Greek and Latin roots in English/P =

Lists of Greek and Latin roots in English beginning with other letters:
- A
- B
- C
- D
- E
- F
- G
- H
- I
- J
- K
- L
- M
- N
- O
- P
- Q
- R
- S
- T
- U
- V
- X
- Z

== P ==
| Root | Meaning in English | Origin language | Etymology (root origin) | English examples |
|---|---|---|---|---|
| pac- | peace | Latin | pax, pacis | appease, Pacific, pacify, pay |
| pach- | thick | Greek | παχύς (pakhús), πάχος, πάχεος (pákhos, pákheos) | pachydermata, pachyglossia, pachynsis, Pachypodium |
| pact- | fasten | Latin | pangere "to fix, fasten" | compact, impact, impaction, impinge, page, propagate |
| pact- | agreement | Latin | pacisci "to covenant, to agree, make a treaty" | pact |
| pae- | strike | Greek | παίειν (paíein), (paistos) | anapaest, anapaestic, anapest, anapestic |
| paed-, ped- | child | Greek | παῖς, παιδός (paîs, paidós), παιδικός (paidikós) | orthopedic, paediatric, paedogenesis, paedomorphism, page, pedagogue, pedagogy, pedant, pedantic, pediatric, pedodontics, pedophilia |
| pagin- | page | Latin | pagina | pagination |
| pal- | stake | Latin | palus | impale, impalement, pale, palisade, pole, travail, travel |
| palae-, pale- | ancient, old | Greek | παλαιός (palaiós) | paleo diet, paleobiology, paleobotanic, Paleocene, Paleogene, Paleolithic, paleology, paleomagnetism, paleontology, paleopolyploidy, paleopsychology, Paleozoic |
| palin-, palim- | back | Greek | πάλιν (pálin) | palimpsest, palindrome, palingenesis, palinspastic |
| pall- | be pale | Latin | pallere | pallid, pallor |
| palli- | cloak | Latin | palliare "to cover, cloak", from pallium "cloak" | pall, palliate, palliative, pallium |
| palm- | palm | Latin | palma | palmate |
| palp- | touch | Latin | palpare | palp, palpable, palpate, palpation, palpitant, palpitation |
| palustr- | in marshes | Latin | paluster | palustral |
| pan- | Pan | Greek | πάειν, Πάν (Pán), Πανικός (Panikós) | panic |
| pan-, pam- | all | Greek | πᾶς, παντός (pantós), πᾶν (pân), πασῶν, παντότης, πάντοθεν | diapason, panacea, pandemic, pandemonium, panoply, panoptic, pantology, parrhesia |
| pan- | bread | Latin | pānis | accompaniment, accompany, appanage, companion, company, empanada, impanate, impanation, panelle, panetela, panetella, panettone, panivorous, pannier, pantry |
| pand-, pans- | spread | Latin | pandere, pansus/passus | compass, dispand, dispansion, encompass, encompassment, expand, expanse, expansion, expansive, expansivity, impassable, impasse, pace, pandiculate, pandiculation, passus, repand, spawn, subrepand |
| par-, para- | beside, near | Greek | παρά (pará) | parable, parabola, parallel, parallelepiped, parameter, parapagus, paradox, parody |
| par- | equal | Latin | par | compare, disparage, par, parity, peer, subpar |
| par- | order, prepare, provide, procure | Latin | parare | apparat, apparatus, co-emperor, comprador, disparate, disrepair, dissever, disseverance, emperor, empery, empire, empress, imperant, imperative, imperator, imperious, inseparable, irreparable, parade, pare, parison, parry, parure, preparation, preparative, preparatory, prepare, repair, reparable, reparation, reparative, separability, separable, separate, separation, separative, separator, separatory, separatrix, sever, severability, severable, several, severance, vituperate |
| parc-, pars- | spare, save | Latin | parcere, parsus | parcity, parsimonious, parsimony |
| pariet- | wall | Latin | paries, parietis | parietal |
| part- | part | Latin | pars, partis | apart, bipartite, compartment, depart, impartial, parcel, part, partial, participate, particle, partisan, partition |
| parthen- | virgin | Greek | παρθένος (parthénos) | parthenocarpy, parthenogenesis, Parthenon, Parthenope |
| parv- | little | Latin | parvus | parvovirus, parvorder |
| pasc-, past- | feed | Latin | pāscere, pāstus | antepast, antipasto, pabulum, pastel, pastern, pastiglia, pastille, pastor, pastorage, pastoral, pastorale, pastorate, pastorium, pasturable, pasturage, pastural, pasture, repast, repasture |
| pass- | sprinkle | Greek | πάσσειν (pássein), παστός (pastós) | paste |
| pass- | pace, step | Latin | passus | |
| passer- | sparrow | Latin | passer | passeriform, passerine |
| pat- | path | Greek | πάτος (pátos), πατεῖν (pateîn), πατητός, πατητής, πατητήριον | peripatetic, peripateticism |
| pat- | be open | Latin | patere | impatent, patefaction, patella, patellar, patelliform, paten, patency, patent, patera, patin |
| path- | feeling, disease | Greek | πάσχειν (páskhein), παθητικός (pathētikós), πάθος (páthos) | allopath, allopathy, antipathy, apathetic, apathy, empathy, etiopathogenesis, homeopathic, homeopathy, idiopathic, pathetic, pathoclisis, pathogen, pathogenesis, pathogenic, pathologist, pathology, pathos, psychopath, psychopathic, psychopathy, sympathectomy, sympathetic, sympathy |
| pater-, patr- | father | Greek | πατήρ, πατρός (patḗr, patrós), πατριά (patriá), πατριώτης (patriṓtēs) | allopatric, allopatry, eupatrides, patriarch, patriarchy, patriot, patriotic, patriotism, patrology, patronym, patronymic, sympatric, sympatry |
| pater-, patr- | father | Latin | pater (genitive patris) | compadre, compaternity, compère, impetrate, impetration, impetrative, impetrator, Jupiter, padre, padrone, paterfamilias, paternal, paternity, paternoster, patriate, patriation, Patricia, patrician, patriciate, patricidal, patricide, Patrick, patriclinous, patricliny, patrifocal, patrilateral, patrilineage, patrilineal, patrilineality, patrilinear, patrilocal, patrilocality, patrimonial, patrimony, patron, patronage, patronal, patronate, patroness, patroon, patter, pattern, père, perpetrable, perpetrate, perpetration, perpetrator, repatriate, repatriation |
| pati-, pass- | suffer, feel, endure, permit | Latin | pati, passus | compassion, compassionate, compatibility, compatible, dispassion, dispassionate, impassible, impassion, impassive, impassivity, impatible, impatience, impatient, incompatibility, incompatible, interpatient, noncompatible, nonpassible, passibility, passible, passion, passional, passionary, passionate, passive, passivity, patible, patience, patient, patientive, perpession |
| pauc- | few | Latin | paucus | paucal, pauciloquent, paucity |
| pav- | beat | Latin | pavire | pavage, pave, pavement, pavior |
| pecc- | sin | Latin | peccatum "sin, fault, error", from peccare "to miss, mistake" | impeccable, peccadillo, peccant, peccavi |
| pect- | fixed | Greek | πηκτός (pēktós) | pectic, pectin |
| pector- | chest | Latin | pectus, pectoris | pectoral, expectorate |
| pecu- | property | Latin | pecunia "property", from pecu "cattle" | peculiar, pecuniary, pecunious |
| ped- | foot | Latin | pes, pedis | biped, bipedal, centipedal, centipede, decempedal, expediency, expedient, expeditate, expedite, expedition, expeditionary, expeditious, impeach, impeachable, impeachment, impede, impediment, impedition, impeditive, inexpedient, interpetiolar, intrapetiolar, millipede, multiped, multipede, octopede, oppidum, pawn, pedal, pedate, pedatifid, pedestal, pedestrian, pedicel, pedicle, pedicure, pediform, pedigerous, pedigree, peduncle, pedunculate, peon, peonage, petiolar, petiolate, petiole, petiolular, petiolulate, petiolule, piedfort, piedmont, pioneer, quadruped, quadrupedal, repedation, revamp, semiped, semipedal, sesquipedal, stapes, stapedius, subpetiolate, suppedaneum, tripedal, trivet, vamp, velocipede |
| peg-, pect- | fix | Greek | πηγνύναι (pēgnúnai), πηκτός (pēktós), πηκτικός (pēktikós), πῆξις (pêxis), πῆγμα (pêgma), πάγη (págē), πάγος (págos), πάγιος (págios), παγιότης (pagiótēs), πάσσαλος (pássalos) | hysteropexy, pagophobia, parapagus, pectic, pectin, rheopectic, rheopecty, rheopexy |
| pejor- | worse | Latin | pejor | pejorative |
| pel- | clay, mud | Greek | πηλός (pēlós) | pelite, pelitic |
| pelag- | sea | Greek | πέλαγος (pélagos), πελαγικός (pelagikós) | abyssopelagic, allopelagic, archipelagic, archipelago, bathypelagic, epipelagic, hadopelagic, mesopelagic, pelagic, pelagonym |
| pelarg- | stork | Greek | πελαργός (pelargós), πελαργώδης | pelargonic, Pelargonium |
| pell-, puls- | drive, push | Latin | pellere, pulsus | appulse, compel, compulsory, dispel, expel, expulsion, impel, impulse, propel, propellent, propulsion, propulsive, propulsor, pulsate, pulse, push, repel, repellent, repulsive |
| pemp-, pomp- | send | Greek | πέμπειν (pémpein), πομπή (pompḗ) | apopemptic, hypnopompic, pomp, psychopomp |
| pen- | almost | Latin | paene | peninsula, penultimate, penumbra |
| pen-, poen-, puni- | punish | Latin | punire "punish" (earlier poenire), from poena "punishment" | impune, impunity, pain, penal, penalize, penalty, penance, penitence, penitent, penitentiary, pine, punish, punitive, repent, subpoena |
| pend-, pens- | hang | Latin | pensare, frequentative of pendere | append, penchant, pendant, pending, pendulum, pensive, prepense, suspend, suspense |
| penia- | deficiency | Greek | πενία (penía) | leukopenia |
| penn-, pinn- | feather | Latin | penna, pinna | pennate, pinnacle, pinnate, pinnule |
| pent- | five | Greek | πέντε (pénte), πεντάς, πεντάδος (pentás, pentádos), πεντάκις (pentákis) "five times", πενταπλάσιος (pentaplásios) "five-fold", πενταχοῦ | diapente, pentachoric, pentad, pentagon, pentagram, pentalpha, pentapolis, pentatonic, pentatope, pentode |
| pentacosi- | five hundred | Greek | πεντακόσιοι (pentakósioi) | pentacosiomedimni |
| pentecont- | fifty | Greek | πεντήκοντα (pentḗkonta), πεντηκοντάς, πεντηκοντάδος (pentēkontás, pentēkontádos) | pentecontad, pentecontagon |
| pentecost- | fiftieth | Greek | πεντηκοστός (pentēkostós) | Pentecost, pentecostalism |
| peper- | pepper | Greek | πέπερι, πεπέρεως | paprika, pepper |
| pepon- | ripe | Greek | πέπων, πέπονος (pépōn, péponos) | pumpkin |
| pept- | digest | Greek | πέσσειν (péssein), πεπτός (peptós), πεπτικός (peptikós), πέψις (pépsis) | dipeptide, dyspepsia, dyspeptic, eupepsia, eupeptic, monopeptide, oligopeptide, pepsin, peptic, peptide, peptone, polypeptide, tetrapeptide, tripeptide |
| per-, pel- | thoroughly, through | Latin | per | pellucid, perfection, permeate, pernicious, persistence, peruse, pervade |
| peri- | pouch, wallet | Greek | πήρα (pḗra), πηρίδιον (pērídion) | peridium |
| peran- | across, beyond | Greek | πέραν (péran) | Perates |
| perdic- | partridge | Greek | πέρδιξ, πέρδικος (pérdix, pérdikos) | Melanoperdix, partridge |
| peri- | around | Greek | περί (perí) | Pericles, pericope, perigee, perihelion, perimeter, period, periphery, periscope |
| persic- | peach | Greek | περσικός (persikós) | |
| pessim- | worst | Latin | pessimus | pessimal, pessimistic |
| pet- | strive toward | Latin | petere | appetite, compete, competition, impetus, petition, petulant, propitiate, repeat, repetition |
| petr- | rock | Greek | πέτρα (pétra) | epipetric, petrify, petroglyph, petrographic, petrography, petroleum, petrology, petrosomatoglyph |
| phac- | lens | Greek | φακός (phakós) | Phacochoerus, phacoemulsification |
| phae-, phe- | dark | Greek | φαιός (phaiós) | phaeohyphomycosis, phaeomelanin, pheochrome, pheochromocytoma |
| phag- | eat | Greek | φαγεῖν (phageîn), φαγία (phagía) | autophagosome, autophagy, bacteriophage, dysphagia, esophagitis, geophagia, hematophagy, macrophage, odynophagia, phagocyte, phagocytosis, phagolysosome, phagophilia, phagophobia, phagosome, phagy, polyphagia, pseudodysphagia, sarcophagus |
| phalang- | close formation of troops, finger bones | Greek | φάλαγξ, φάλαγγος (phálangos) | aphalangia, phalanges, phalanx |
| phalar- | having a patch of white | Greek | φάλαρος (phálaros) | phalarope |
| pharmac- | drug, medicine | Greek | φάρμακον (phármakon) | alexipharmic, pharmaceutics, pharmacodynamics, pharmacogenetics, pharmacogenomic, pharmacokinetics, pharmacology, pharmacophobia, pharmacy |
| phan-, phen- | to show, visible | Greek | φαίνειν (phaínein), φαντός (phantós), φαινόμενον (phainómenon), φάσις (phásis) | diaphanous, emphasis, epiphany, fantasy, phanerozoic, phantasm, phantom, phase, phene, phenetic, phenology, phenomenon, phenotype, photic, prophase, sycophant, telophase, theophany, tryptophan |
| pheb-, phob- | fear | Greek | φέβεσθαι (phébesthai), φόβος (phóbos), φοβέω | autophobia, hydrophobia, panphobia, phobophobia |
| pher-, phor- | bear, carry | Greek | φέρειν (phérein), φορά (phorá), φόρος (phóros) | adiaphora, adiaphorism, anaphor, metaphor, pheromone, phoresis, phoresy, phosphor, prosphora, pyrophoric |
| pheug-, phyg- (ΦΥΓ) | flee | Greek | φεύγειν (pheúgein), φυγή, φυγάς, φυγάδος (phugás, phugádos) "fugitive", φυγαδικός | apophyge, hypophyge |
| phil-, -phile | love, friendship | Greek | φίλος (phílos), φιλικός (philikós), φιλεῖν (phileîn), φιλία (philía), φίλτρον (phíltron) | bibliophile, heterophil, hydrophile, paraphilia, philanthropy, philharmonic, philophobia, philosophy, philter, philtre, philtrum |
| phim- | muzzle | Greek | φῑμός (phīmós), φιμοῦν (phimoûn), φιμωτικός, φίμωσις (phímōsis) | paraphimosis, phimosis, phimotic |
| phleb- | vein | Greek | φλέψ, φλεβός (phléps, phlebós), φλέβιον | phlebitis, phlebography, phlebosclerosis, phlebotomist, phlebotomize, phlebotomy, thrombophlebitis |
| phleg-, phlog- | burn, heat, inflammation | Greek | φλέγειν (phlégein), φλέγμα (phlégma), φλόξ (phlóx) "flame" | phlegm, phlegmasia, phlegmatic, phlegmon, phlegmonous, phlogistic, phlogiston, Phlox |
| phloe- | tree bark | Greek | φλοιός (phloiós) | hypophloeodic, phlobaphene, phloem, phloeophagy |
| phlog- | fire, flame | Greek | | |
| phob- | fear | Greek | φόβος (phóbos) | acrophobia, arachnophobia, claustrophobia, ergophobia, homophobia, hydrophobia, zeusophobia |
| phon- | sound | Greek | φωνή (phōnḗ), φωνητικός (phōnētikós), φώνημα (phṓnēma) | acrophonic, acrophony, allophone, antiphon, antiphony, aphonia, aphonic, apophony, archiphoneme, cacophony, diaphony, diplophonia, dysphonia, euphonic, euphonious, euphonize, euphony, heterophonic, heterophony, homophone, homophonous, homophony, hypophonesis, ideophone, idiophone, isophone, logophonetic, megaphone, microphone, misophonia, monophonic, monophony, morphophonology, phonaesthesia, phonaesthetics, phone, phonemic, phonesthemic, phonetic, phonetics, phonics, phonogram, phonograph, phonology, phonophobia, phonosemantics, phonotactics, polyphonic, polyphony, stereophonic, symphonic, symphony, telephonic, telephony |
| phos-, phot- | light | Greek | φῶς, φωτός (phōtós) | aphotic, biophoton, cataphote, diphoton, euphotic, microphotograph, phosphor, phosphorus, photic, photo, photobiology, photocatalysis, photochromism, photoelectric, photogenic, photogram, photograph, photography, photolysis, photometer, photometric, photometry, photon, photoperiod, photophobia, photophone, photophore, photopic, photoptarmosis, photosynthesis, phototaxis, phototherapy, phototroph, telephoto |
| phrag- (ΦΡΑΓ) | fence | Greek | φράσσειν (phrássein), φράξις (phráxis), φράγμα (phrágma) | diaphragm |
| phren-, phron- | mind | Greek | φρήν, φρενός (phrḗn, phrenós) | euneirophrenia, euphrasy, Euphrosyne, frantic, frenetic, frenzy, oneirophrenia, phrenetic, -phrenia, phrenic, phrenitis, phrenology, phronema, phronesis, phronetic, schizophrenia, sophrosyne |
| phryn- | toad, toad-like | Greek | φρύνη (phrúnē) | Phrynobatrachus |
| phtheg- | utter | Greek | φθέγγεσθαι (phthéngesthai), φθεγκτός, φθεγκτικός, φθέγξις, φθέγμα, φθέγματος (phthégma, phthégmatos), φθεγματικός, φθόγγος (phthóngos), φθογγή | apophthegm, apophthegmatic, diphthong, diphthongize, monophthong, monophthongize |
| phyc- | seaweed | Greek | φῦκος, φύκεος (phûkos, phúkeos) | phycology, Phycomyces, schizophyceous |
| phyl- | tribe | Greek | φύλον (phúlon) | phylogenetics, phylum |
| phyll- | leaf | Greek | φύλλον (phúllon) | chlorophyll, phyllotaxis |
| phys- | bladder | Greek | φῦσα (phûsa) | physogastric, physostomous, Triplophysa |
| physi- | nature | Greek | φύσις (phúsis) | physics, physician |
| physalid- | bladder | Greek | φυσαλ(λ)ίς (phusal(l)is) | physalis |
| phyt- | plant | Greek | φύειν (phúein), φυτόν (phutón) | archaeophyte, autophyte, bryophyte, dermatophyte, neophyte, phytonym, phytoplankton |
| pi- | kind, devout, pity | Latin | pius | expiate, impious, piety, pious, pity |
| pic- | pitch | Latin | pix, picis | piceous |
| piez- | squeeze | Greek | πιέζειν (piézein), πιεστός (piestós), πίεσις, πίεσμα, πίεσματος, πιεστήρ | isopiestic, piezochromism, piezoelectric, piezometer |
| pil- | hair | Latin | pilus | depilatory, epilator |
| pil- | pillar, ball | Latin | pila | pile, pill, pillar, pillory |
| pin- (ΠΟ) | drink | Greek | πίνειν (pínein), πῶμα | pinocytosis |
| pin- | pine | Latin | pinus | pineal gland |
| ping-, pict- | paint | Latin | pingere, pictus | depiction, picture, pigment |
| pingu- | fat | Latin | pinguis | Pinguicula, pinguitude |
| pir- | try | Greek | πεῖρα, πείρας (peîra, peíras), πειρᾶν (peirân), πειρατής (peiratḗs), πειρατικός (peiratikós), (peirāteía), πειράζω, πείρασις, πειρασμός | antipiracy, apeirogon, apeirohedron, piracy, pirate, piratic |
| pir- | pear | Latin | pirus | piriformis muscle |
| pisc- | fish | Latin | piscis | Pisces, piscivore |
| pis- | pea | Greek | πίσος (písos) | pisoid, pisolite |
| pithec- | ape, monkey | Greek | πίθηκος (píthēkos) | australopithecine, Australopithecus, caenopithecine |
| plac- | plain, plate, tablet | Greek | πλάξ, πλακός (pláx, plakós) | Aplacophora, placenta, placode |
| plac- | calm | Latin | placare, placatus | implacable, placable, placate, please, supple |
| plac-, plea- | please | Latin | placēre, placitus | complacent, complaisant, displease, placebo, placid, plea, please, pleasure |
| plag- | oblique | Greek | πλάγος (plágos), πλάγιος (plágios), πλαγιότης | plage, plagiocephaly, plagioclase, plagiotropic, playa |
| plan- | wander | Greek | πλάνος, πλανάομαι, πλανᾶσθαι (planâsthai), (planáein), πλανητός (planētós), πλανήτης (planḗtēs) | airplane, aplanetic, aplanogamete, aplanospore, exoplanet, planet, planetoid, planetonym, planoblast, planogamete, planospore, protoplanet |
| plan- | flat | Latin | plānus | applanate, applanation, aquaplane, complanar, complanate, coplanar, coplanarity, deplanate, deplane, emplane, esplanade, explain, explanation, explanatory, peneplain, pianissimo, piano, pianoforte, plain, plaintext, plan, planar, planarian, planary, planate, planation, plane, planification, planiform, planish, planula, planular, planulate |
| plang-, planct- | strike, beat; lament, mourn | Latin | plangere, planctus | plangent |
| plas- | mould | Greek | πλάσσειν (plássein), πλαστός (plastós), πλαστικός (plastikós), πλάσις (plásis), πλάσμα, πλάσματος (plásma, plásmatos), πλάθω (pláthō) | plasma, plastic, plastique, plastochron, plastromancy, plastron, prosoplasia, protoplasm, pseudoplastic, symplast |
| plat- | flat, broad | Greek | πλατύς (platús), πλατεῖα (plateîa) | piazza, place, plaice, plateau, platitude, platyhelminth, platypus, Platyrrhini, platysma, Platyzoa, plaza |
| plaud-, -plod-, plaus-, -plos- | approve, clap | Latin | plaudere, plausus | applaud, applause, explode, explosion, implode, plaudits, plausible |
| ple- (ΠΛΕ) | fill, full | Greek | πιμπλάναι (pimplánai), πλέως/πλέος, πλειότερος, πλειότης, πλήρης (plḗrēs), πληρόω, πλήρωσις (plḗrōsis), πλήρωμα (plḗrōma), πλήθειν (plḗthein), πλῆθος (plêthos), πληθύς, πληθύω, πληθύνω (plēthúnō), πληθυντικός, πληθώρα/πληθώρη (plēthṓra), πληθωρικός (plēthōrikós), πληθυσμός (plēthusmós) | pleroma, plethodontid, plethora, plethoric, plethysm, plethysmograph, plethysmometry |
| ple- | sail, swim | Greek | πλεῖν (pleîn), πλεῦσις (pleûsis), πλόος | pleon, pleopod, pleuston |
| ple-, plet- | fill | Latin | plere | complement, complete, deplete, implement, replete, suppletion, supply |
| pleb- | people | Latin | plebs, plebis | plebeian, plebs |
| plec-, ploc- | plait, interweave | Greek | πλέκειν (plékein), πλεκτός (plektós), πλεκτικός (plektikós), πλέξις (pléxis), πλέγμα (plégma), πλοκή (plokḗ), πλόκος | plectics, plexogenic, ploce, symplectic, symplectomorphism, symploce |
| plect-, plex- | plait | Latin | plectere, plexus | perplex |
| pleg- (ΠΛΗΓ) | strike | Greek | πλήσσειν (plḗssein), πληκτός (plēktós), πλήκτης, πληγή (plēgḗ), πλῆξις (plêxis), πλῆγμα, πλήκτης, πλῆκτρον | apoplectic, apoplexy, cataplectic, cataplexy, hemiplegia, monoplegia, paraplegia, plectrum, pleximeter, tetraplegia |
| plen- | full | Latin | plenus | plenary, plenitude, plenty, replenish |
| plesi- | near | Greek | πλησίος (plēsíos), πλησιότης (plēsiótēs) | plesiosaur |
| pleth- | | | | |
| pleur- | rib, side | Greek | πλευρά (pleurá), πλευρόν (pleurón) | metapleural, pleura, pleurisy, pleuritis, pleurodynia, pleuron |
| plic- | fold | Latin | plicare, plicatus | appliance, applicability, applicable, applicant, applicate, application, applicative, applicator, applicatory, appliqué, apply, centuplicate, centuplication, complicacy, complicant, complicate, complication, complice, complicity, conduplicate, conduplication, duplication, explicate, explicit, implicate, implicit, imply, plait, pleat, pliable, pliant, plight, ply, replica, replicate, replication, replicative, replicator, reply, splay, subduplicate, supplicant, supplicate, supplication, triplicate, triplicity |
| plinth- | brick | Greek | πλίνθος (plínthos) | plinth, Plinthograptis |
| ploc- | | | | |
| plor- | cry out, complain | Latin | plorare | deplorable, deploration, deplore, exploration, exploratory, explore, imploration, imploratory, implore |
| plu- | rain | Latin | pluere, see also pluvia | pluvial |
| plum- | feather | Latin | pluma | plumage, plumate |
| plumb- | lead | Latin | plumbum | plumber |
| plur-, plus- | more | Latin | plus, pluris | double, plural, pluralist, plus, quadruple, surplus, triple |
| plurim- | most | Latin | plurimus | plurimal |
| plut- | wealth | Greek | πλοῦτος (ploûtos) | ploutonion, plutarchy, plutocracy, plutocrat, plutolatry, plutomania, plutonomics, Plutus |
| pne- | blow, breathe, lung | Greek | πνεῖν (pneîn), πνεῦμα (pneûma), πνεύμων (pneúmōn) | anapnograph, anapnoic, apnea, apnoea, dyspnoea, pleuropneumonia, pneumatic, pneumatology, pneumonia, pneumonic, pneumotaxic |
| pnig-, pnict- | choke | Greek | πνίγειν (pnígein), πνῖγος, πνῖγμα, πνιγμός, πνικτός, πνικτικός | pnictide, pnictogen |
| po-, pin- (ΠΟ) | drink | Greek | πίνειν (pínein), πόσις, πῶμα | pinocytosis, pinosome, symposium |
| pod- | foot | Greek | πούς, ποδός (podós), ποδικός (podikós), ποδία (podía), πόδιον (pódion), πέδον (pédon), πεδίον, πέζα | amphipod, antipode, decapod, podiatry, podium, podomancy, podomere, podopaediatric, polyp, polyposis, sympodium, tetrapod, tripod |
| pogon- | beard | Greek | πώγων, πώγωνος (pṓgōn, pṓgōnos), πωγωνίας (pōgōnías) | pogonia, pogoniasis, pogonology, pogonophobia, pogonotrophy, Triplopogon |
| poie-, poe- | make | Greek | ποιϝέω, ποιεῖν (poieîn), ποιητός (poiētós) "made", ποιητικός (poiētikós), ποίησις (poíēsis), ποίημα (poíēma), ποιητής (poiētḗs) "maker" | allopoiesis, autopoiesis, onomatopoeia, piyyut, poem, poesy, poet, poetaster, poetic, poiesis |
| pol- | pole | Greek | πόλος (pólos) | dipole, polar |
| pole- | sell | Greek | πωλεῖν (pōleîn), πώλησις, πώλης "seller" | duopoly, monopolist, monopolize, monopoly, oligopolist, oligopoly |
| polem- | war | Greek | πολεμεῖν (polemeîn), πόλεμος (pólemos), πολεμικός (polemikós) | polemarch, polemic, polemology |
| poli- | city | Greek | πόλις, πόλιος (pólis, pólios), πολίτης (polítēs), πολιτικός (politikós) | acropolis, biopolitics, cosmopolis, cosmopolitan, Decapolis, ecumenopolis, eperopolis, geopolitics, heptapolis, hexapolis, isopolity, megalopolis, megapolis, metropolis, pentapolis, police, policy, polis, politeia, politic, politicize, politics, politologist, politology, politonym, polity, propolis, tetrapolis, Tripoli |
| poli- | gray, grey | Greek | πολιός (poliós), πολιότης | poliomyelitis, poliosis |
| poll- | many | Greek | πολλός (pollós) | |
| pollic- | thumb | Latin | pollex, pollicis | pollicate |
| pollin- | fine flour | Latin | pollen, pollinis | pollination |
| poly- | many | Greek | πολύς (polús), πολλός (pollós), πολλότης (pollótēs), πολλάκις (pollákis) "many times", πολλαπλάσιος/πολυπλάσιος, πλείων (pleíōn) "more", πλεῖστος (pleîstos) "most", πολλοστός (pollostós) | hoi polloi, pollakanth, polyadic, polyandry, polygamy, polygon, polyphase, polysaccharide, polytheistic |
| pomp- | | | | |
| pomph- | blister | Greek | πομφός (pomphós), πομφόλυξ | podopompholyx, pompholyx |
| pon-, posit- | put | Latin | ponere, positus | apposite, apropos, component, depose, deposit, exponent, expose, expound, impose, impound, opponent, position, positive, postpone, posture, propone, proponent, proposition, propound, repose |
| ponder- | weight | Latin | pondus, ponderis, ponderare | ponder, preponderance |
| pont- | bridge | Latin | pons, pontis | pontiff, pontificate, pontoon |
| popul- | people | Latin | populus, populare | population, popular, populous |
| por- | passage | Greek | πόρος (póros), πορεύω, πορίζειν (porízein), πόρισμα (pórisma) | aporetic, aporia, emporium, gonopore, ozopore, polypore, pore, porism, porismatic |
| porc- | pig | Latin | porcus | porcine, pork |
| porn- | prostitute | Greek | πόρνη (pórnē) | pornographic, pornography |
| porphyr- | purple | Greek | πορφύρα (porphúra) | porphyrin, porphyritic, porphyrophobia, porphyry |
| port- | carry | Latin | portare "to carry", porta "gate" | comportment, deport, export, import, port, portable, portage, portal, porter, portfolio, purport, rapport, report, support, transport |
| portion- | part, share | Latin | portio | portion, proportion |
| post- | after, behind | Latin | post | posterior, posterity, postscript |
| pot- | power | Latin | potere "be powerful", from potis "powerful, able" | despot, impotent, possess, potent, potentate, potential, power |
| pot- | drink | Latin | potus, potare | potable, potion |
| potam- | river | Greek | ποταμός (potamós) | autopotamic, hippopotamus, Mesopotamia, potamic, potamodromous, potamology, potamonym, potamophobia, potamoplankton |
| prag- | do | Greek | πράσσειν (prássein), πράττειν (práttein), πρασσόμενον, πρακτός (praktós), πρακτικός (praktikós), (prāktikḗ), πρᾶξις (prâxis), πρᾶγμα (prâgma) | apraxia, dyspraxia, parapraxis, practic, practice, pragma, pragmatic, pragmatism, pragmatist, praxis |
| pras- | leek | Greek | πράσον (práson), πράσινος (prásinos) "leek-green", πρασιά | chrysoprase, prasinous, prasinophobia |
| prat- | meadow | Latin | pratum | |
| prav- | crooked | Latin | pravus | depravity |
| pre- | before | Latin | prae | previous |
| prec- | pray | Latin | precāri "to ask, beg, pray", from prex "prayer" | deprecation, imprecation, pray, prayer, precarious |
| pred- | prey | Latin | praedari "plunder", from praeda "prey" | depredate, predation, predator, predatory, prey |
| prehend-, prend-, prehens- | grasp | Latin | prehendere, prehensus | apprehend, comprehend, comprehensive, enterprise, prehensility, prehension, prey, prison, prize, reprehend, surprise |
| prem-, -prim-, press- | press | Latin | premere, pressus | compress, compression, compressor, depress, depression, depressive, espresso, express, expression, expressive, impress, impression, impressive, imprimatur, imprint, oppress, oppression, oppressive, oppressor, press, pressure, print, repress, repression, repressive, reprimand, suppress, suppression, suppressor |
| presby- | old | Greek | πρέσβυς (présbus), πρεσβύτερος (presbúteros), (presbutérion) | archpresbyter, presbyter, Presbyterianism, presbyterium, presbytery, priest, protopresbyter |
| preter- | past | Latin | praeter | preterite, pretermission |
| preti- | price | Latin | pretium, pretiare | |
| pri- | saw | Greek | πρίειν (príein), πρῖσις (prîsis), πρίων, πρίονος (príōn, príonos) | prion |
| priap- | | Greek | πριάπος | priapism, Priapus |
| prim- | first | Latin | primus | coprime, nonprime, prima facie, primacy, primal, primality, primary, primate, prime, primer, primeval, primine, primitive, primogeniture, primordial, primrose, Primula, semiprime, subprimal, subprime |
| prior- | former | Latin | prior | prior, priority, priory, pristine, repristinate, subprior |
| prism- | to saw, something sawed | Greek | πρίσμα, πρίσματος (prísma, prísmatos), πρισμάτιον (prismátion) | antiprism, prism, prismatic, prismatoid |
| priv- | own | Latin | privus, privare, privatus | deprivation, deprive, privacy, private, privateer, privation, privative, privilege, privity, privy, semiprivate |
| pro- | before, in front of | Greek | πρό (pró), πρότερος (próteros) "former", πρῶτος (prôtos) | prologue, prostate, prow |
| pro- | for, forward | Latin | pro | procrastinate, propel, propulsion |
| prob- | worthy, good | Latin | probare "prove to be worthy", probus | approbation, approve, disapprobation, opprobrium, probable, probation, probe, probity, proof, prove, reprobate, reprove |
| proct- | anus | Greek | πρωκτός (prōktós) | Ectoprocta, Entoprocta, epiproct, hypoproct, paraproct, periproct, proctalgia, proctology |
| prodig- | waste | Latin | prodigus "wasteful", from prodigere "drive away, waste" | prodigal, prodigality |
| prodig- | prodigy | Latin | prodigium "prodigy" | prodigious, prodigy |
| propri- | property; one's own | Latin | proprietas "appropriateness, property, ownership", from proprius "one's own" | appropriate, proper, property, proprietary, proprietor, propriety |
| pros- | forth, forward | Greek | πρός (prós), πρόσθεν (prósthen), πρόσθιος (prósthios) | prosenchyma, prosophobia, prosthesis, prosthion |
| prosop- | face | Greek | πρόσωπον (prósōpon) | aprosopia, diprosopus, prosopography, prosoponym, prosopopoeia, prosopospasm |
| prot- | first | Greek | πρῶτος (prôtos) (Note: Contracted from *πρόατος) | amphiprotic, antiproton, protagonist, protanomaly, protanopia, protein, protist, protocol, proton, protoplasm, prototype, Protozoa |
| proter- | former | Greek | πρό (pró), πρότερος (próteros), προτερέω | Proterozoic |
| proxim- | nearest | Latin | proximus, proximare | approximate, proximity |
| prun- | plum | Latin | prunus | prune |
| psa- | rub | Greek | ψᾶν (psân), ψαφαρός, ψήχειν, (psēstós) | palimpsest |
| psall- | pluck | Greek | ψάλλειν (psállein), ψαλμός (psalmós) | psalm, psalmodicon, psalmody, psalter, psaltery, psaltikon |
| psamath- | sand | Greek | | |
| psamm- | sand | Greek | ψάμμος (psámmos), ψάμαθος (psámathos) | psammite, psammitic, psammoma, psammophile, Psammophis, psammophyte, psammosere, psammous |
| pseph- | pebble | Greek | ψάω, ψῆφος (psêphos), ψηφίζειν (psēphízein) | isopsephy, psephite, psephitic, psephocracy, psephology |
| pseud- | false | Greek | ψεύδω, ψεῦδος (pseûdos) | pseudonym |
| pseud- | false | Greek | ψεύδομαι, ψευδής (pseudḗs) | pseudonym |
| psil- | bare | Greek | ψιλοῦν (psiloûn), ψιλός (psilós), ψιλότης, ψίλωσις (psílōsis) | epsilon, psilanthropism, psilanthropy, psilocybin, psilosis, psilotic, upsilon |
| psithyr- | whisper | Greek | ψίθυρος, ψιθυρίζω, ψιθυρισμός | Psithyrisma |
| psittac- | parrot | Greek | ψιττακός, ψιττακοῦ (psittakós, psittakoû) | psittacine, psittacism, psittacosis |
| psoph- | noise | Greek | ψόφος (psóphos), ψοφεῖν, ψοφητικός, ψόφησις, ψόφημα, ψοφοειδής | Psophiidae, Psophocichla, psophometer, psophometric |
| psor- | itch | Greek | ψωρός (psōrós), ψώρα (psṓra), ψωριᾶν (psōriân), (psōríāsis) | psora, psoriasis, psoric, psorosis |
| psych- | mind | Greek | ψύχειν (psúkhein), ψυχή (psukhḗ), ψυχικός (psukhikós) | hylopsychism, panpsychism, psyche, psychedelia, psychedelic, psychiatry, psychic, psychoanalysis, psychologist, psychology, psychopathic, psychopathy, psychopomp, psychosis, psychotherapy, psychotic, psychoticism |
| psychr- | cold | Greek | ψύχω, ψυχρός (psukhrós), ψυχρότης | psychroalgia, psychrometer, psychrophile, psychrophilic, psychrophily |
| pter- | wing | Greek | πτερόν, πτεροῦ (pterón, pteroû), πτέρυξ, πτέρυγος (ptérux, ptérugos), (pterugōtós), πτερίσκος | apterous, apterygote, archaeopteryx, brachypterous, brachyptery, Chiroptera, chiropterologist, Endopterygota, exopterygote, helicopter, hemipterous, heteropterous, homopterous, Neoptera, peripteros, pterodactyl, pteron, pteropod, pterosaur, pterostigma, pterygote, tetrapterous |
| pterid- | fern | Greek | πτερίς, πτερίδος (pterís, pterídos) | pteridology, pteridophyte, pteridosperm |
| pto- | fall | Greek | πίπτειν (píptein), πτωτός (ptōtós), πτωτικός (ptōtikós), πτῶσις (ptôsis), πτῶμα, πτῶματος (ptôma, ptômatos) | anaptotic, asymptomatic, apoptosis, peripeteia, peripety, polyptoton, proptosis, proptotic, ptomaine, ptosis, ptotic, symptom, symptomatic, symptosis |
| ptoch- | poor | Greek | πτωχός (ptōkhós), πτωχότης | ptochocracy, ptochology |
| pty- | spit | Greek | πτύειν, πτύον (ptúon), πτύσις (ptúsis), πτύαλον | hemoptysis, ptyalin, pyoptysis |
| ptych- | fold, layer | Greek | πτύσσειν (ptússein), πτύγμα (ptúgma), πτύξ (ptúx), πτυχός (ptukhós), πτυχή (ptukhḗ) | anaptyctic, anaptyxis, diptych, heptaptych, hexaptych, octaptych, pentaptych, polyptych, tetraptych, triptych |
| pub- | sexually mature | Latin | pubes, puberis | pubescent, pubic |
| public- | public | Latin | publicus | publication, publicity |
| pude- | shame | Latin | pudere | impudent, pudendum, repudiate |
| pug-, pugn- | fight | Latin | pugnare "to fight", from pugnus "fist" | impugn, pugilism, pugnacious, repugnant |
| pulchr- | beautiful | Latin | pulcher, pulchri | pulchritude |
| pulmon- | lung | Latin | pulmo, pulmonis | pulmonary |
| pulver- | dust | Latin | pulvis, pulveris | pulverize |
| pung-, punct- | prick | Latin | pungere, punctus | acupuncture, expunge, poignant, point, punch, punctual, punctuation, puncture, pungent |
| pup- | doll | Latin | pupa | pupa, pupate, puppet |
| pur- | pure | Latin | purare "to purify", from purus "pure" | impurity, pure, puree, purge, purify, purity |
| purg- | cleanse | Latin | purgare | expurgate, purgatory, purge |
| purpur- | purple | Latin | purpura | purpurate, purpureal |
| put- | prune, reckon | Latin | putāre | amputation, compute, dispute, impute, putative, reputation |
| py- | pus | Greek | πύον (púon), (pyeîn) | empyema, pyemia, pyemesis, pyesis, pyocyst, pyogenesis, pyorrhea, pyorrhoea, pyosis, pyoureter |
| pyel- | trough | Greek | πύελος (púelos), πυελίς | pyelectasis, pyelitis, pyelogram, pyelography, pyelonephritis, pyeloscopy |
| pyg- | rump | Greek | πυγή (pugḗ) | callipygian, pygopagus, pygostyle, steatopygia |
| pyl- | gate | Greek | πύλη (púlē), πυλών, πυλῶνος (pulṓn, pulōnos) | apopyle, micropyle, propylaea, prosopyle, pylon, pyloric, pylorus, tetrapylon, Thermopylae |
| pyr- | fire | Greek | πύρ, πυρός (púr, purós), πυρά (purá), πυρότης, πυρετός, πυρέττειν | antipyretic, Empyreuma, pyre, pyrite, pyroclastic, pyrolysis, pyromancy, pyromania, pyromaniac, pyrometric, pyrophobia, pyrophoric, pyrosis, pyrosome, pyrotechnic |
| pyramid- | | Greek | πυραμίς, πυραμίδος | dipyramid, pyramid, pyramidion |
| pyrrh- | flame-colored | Greek | πῦρ, πυρρός, πυρρότης, πυρράζω | pyrrhic |
