= Brain of Vladimir Lenin =

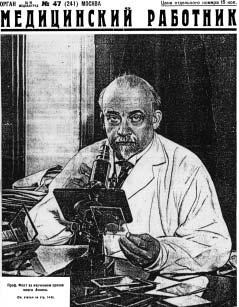
Cover of the Journal Meditsinskii Rabotnik (Medical Worker) (1927) No. 47: "Prof. Fokht za izucheniem srezov mozga Lenina" (Professor Vogt investigating histological sections from Lenin’s brain)

The anatomical study of Vladimir Lenin's brain by the German neurologist and psychiatrist Oskar Vogt in 1924 was a significant event in the history of neuroscience. The study aimed to understand the neural basis of Lenin's political and intellectual abilities. The research was conducted at the request of the Soviet government, which wanted to prove that Lenin's supposed genius was the result of his brain's superior structure. Under Vogt's leadership, the Kaiser Wilhelm Institute for Brain Research in Berlin was established, and the study of Lenin's brain was one of the institute's first major projects. The histological analysis methods used to examine tissue samples and helped establish the procedure as a viable way of studying the brain. Though certain structural aspects in Lenin's brain had been said to contribute to heightened cognitive ability, Vogt was nonetheless unable to identify any particular region within Lenin's brain which provided structural proof to Lenin's genius abilities. While the study has limitations and controversies, it is significant in the context of the field of neuropsychology.

== Context ==
The study and dissection of Lenin's brain is directly attributed to the field of phrenology, the neuroscientific field developed by Franz Joseph Gall that examines the relationship between mental ability and brain structure. The reasons behind dissecting Lenin's brain was by no means a pursuit of Soviet deification of Lenin, nor was it a unique event; rather, it was due to the fact that Lenin was considered to be a genius and that his geniusness was identifiable within his brain structure.

The historical search for biological roots of extraordinary brain capacity was of particular interest throughout the 19th and 20th centuries. It built off of Franz Joseph Gall's late 18th century idea that it would be scientifically beneficial to examine the brains of geniuses as mental qualities and faculties are derived from the brain. In conjunction with the lifelong consideration of Lenin as one of the greatest geniuses of the time, the immediate action to examine his brain upon his death sought to provide insight on the relationship between intellectual capabilities and brain structure. The expectation of the results of dissecting Lenin's brain was that due to Lenin being a mentally extraordinary and gifted individual, his brain must be unique and identifiable as such within his brain structure.

== Scientific studies and observations ==
=== Initial autopsy conducted by Aleksey Abrikosov ===
Vladimir Ilyich Ulyanov's death occurred on January 21, 1924, in Gorki, near Moscow. On January 24, an autopsy was performed by Professor Aleksey Abrikosov, with 27 Russian pathologists and Professor Otfried Foerster in attendance, and his brain was examined. Lenin's brain weighed 1340 grams and showed signs of degeneration, particularly in the left hemisphere. Additionally, two areas of softening were observed in the right occipitotemporal border. The blood vessels above the corpora quadrigemina were congested with blood, and there were signs of hemorrhage. Abrikosov diagnosed the deceased with diffuse atherosclerosis primarily in the brain arteries.

=== Experimentation by Oskar Vogt ===
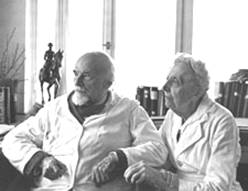
Neuroscientists Oskar Vogt and Cécile Vogt-Mugnier

Neuroanatomical research in pursuit of identifying intellectual genius had been a recurrent in Russian universities. Medical faculties collected the brains of medical professors and other notable individuals who had donated their organs for scientific research. Lenin "was considered to be the greatest of geniuses, and his brain was expected to be unique". Therefore, following his death, Oskar Vogt - a neuroanatomist from the University of Berlin - was requested to conduct histological examinations at the Moscow Brain Research Institute. The institute was especially established for Vogt to conduct analyses on Lenin's brain. Between 1925 and 1927, Vogt conducted a comprehensive analysis of Lenin's brain, involving 153 pages, fifteen albums, and 30,953 brain slices. Some of the methodologies adopted by Vogt included the "cutting, mounting, and staining in serial sections the entire brain" to obtain a "a minute parcellation of the cerebral cortex". The most significant finding was an unusually high number and size of pyramidal cells in the third layer of the cerebral cortex. Vogt called these "association neurons" and were seen as confirmation of Lenin's supposed genius.

On November 10, 1929, Vogt presented his findings to high-ranking officials in the Pantheon Hall of the Moscow Brain Research Institute. The abundance of pyramidal neurons was attributed to Lenin's exceptional intellectual and organizational skills as well as to his rigorous mental training and political activities. Wilder Penfield wrote a letter to his mother in 1929, confirming the validity of Vogt's study on Lenin's brain. According to Penfield, during his visit to the Brain Research Institute in Berlin, he and other visitors were shown many large nerve cells in the third layer of the gray matter of Lenin's brain. The lack of reliable morphometric and statistical controls limited the significance of the cytoarchitectonic observations, but the finding of association neurons was sufficient to please the Politburo without compromising Vogt's integrity or Germany's relationship with Russia. At the presentation, Vogt emphasized the need for further comparative quantitative research including the brains of "elite" individuals, as well as those from diverse ethnic groups. Due to Hitler's rise to power, the changing political climate between Germany and Russia was now bringing an end to their cooperation on neuroscientific research. Vogt’s activities at the Moscow Brain Research Institute ceased and he did not proceed with the comparative experimentation. In 1937, Vogt was fired from the directorship of the Kaiser Wilhelm Institute for Brain Research.

=== Current validity of Vogt's study ===
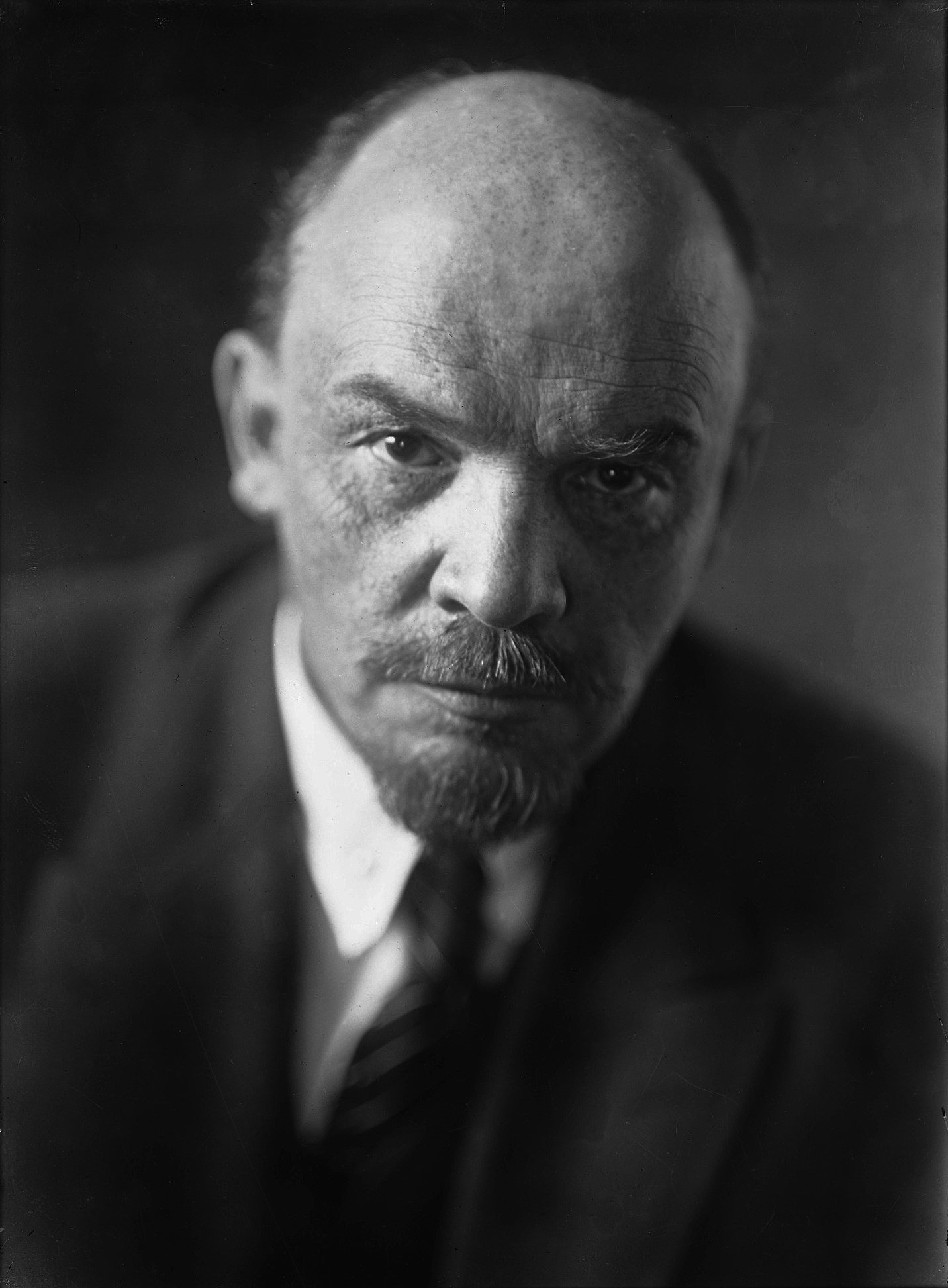
Vladimir Ilyich Ulyanov

Contrary to Lenin’s autopsy which found many irregularities related to his deteriorated condition upon the last years of his life, the dissection of his brain for the purpose of physically identifying extraordinary mental prowess was generally unreliable. Today it is of general agreement among neuroscientists that broad concepts of genius or extraordinary mental prowess cannot be pinned down to physical locations in the brain. Furthermore, upon the conclusion of the dissection of Lenin's brain, there existed many indications expressing perplexity on the matter amongst the neuroscience community as well as regret within Vogt about potentially overexposing himself in his project. This in turn brings the question of validity and acceptance to the project's conclusions. Despite this, Vogt concluded his dissection of Lenin's brain by exclaiming Lenin to have been "a brain athlete and association giant" with a heightened ability in his brain, a conclusion on Lenin still prevalent to this day.

== Doctors behind the dissection ==
The overseers of the dissection of the brain were a married couple; neurologists Oskar and Cecile Vogt. Born in Husum, Germany, the neuroatonomist graduated from Jena University's medical school in 1893, marrying Cécile six years later. Before they met, Vogt worked in the Burghölzli psychiatric hospital for Auguste Forel where Vogt thoroughly studied hypnosis and the effect it bore on patients and its relations with brain components. As a hypnotist, he advocated for the use of hypermnesia to return suppressed, traumatic memories of patients. Vogt moved to Paris for more extensive training in 1896. By 1914, Vogt was made director of the Kaiser Wilhelm Institute located in Berlin. Together, the Vogts had a significant influence on their field. Amongst their findings, their discovery of the cytoarchitectural organization of the cerebral cortex and thalamus had international influence. The German Empire-era institute was responsible for dissecting the brains of murdered patients, with both Cecile and Oskar studying the brains of the "elite".

Despite the Vogts' work in the KWI, they were opponents of the National Social Party dominating Germany in the following decades. The couple had analysed the supposedly "elite" brains of high-profile figures, but they nevertheless resisted hiring staff based on race, culminating in raids on the KWI building by the Nazi Party. Vogt allegedly threw Nazi Propaganda Minister Joseph Goebbels down the stairs at one point. The regime eventually removed Vogt as the head of the KWI in 1937, replacing him with Hugo Spatz. Vogt’s friend and a Foreign Service official in Germany, Gustav Krupp, eventually helped the former create the German Brain Research Society.

Vogt was not a communist, but a socialist, although he sympathised with the communist beliefs echoed by the Soviet Union, which he found progressive. As a result, upon Russian invitation, Vogt went to Moscow to form the Brain Research Institute in 1924 to study the brain of Vladimir Lenin. By this time, the neurologist had become renowned for his work as a brain researcher and garnered the attention of the Soviet Union. As mentioned previously, Vogt sought to study the brains of those whom he viewed as intellectuals and elite minds with the backing of Germany's Weimar Republic, which wanted to improve relations with Russia.
