= Cécile Vogt-Mugnier =

French neurologist (1875–1962)

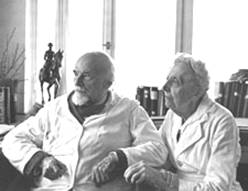
- Cecile (on right) with her husband Oskar (on left)
- Born: 27 March 1875; Annecy, France
- Died: 4 May 1962 (aged 87); Cambridge, England
- Education: Bicêtre Hospital
- Known for: Neuroanatomy of the thalamus
- Spouse: Oskar Vogt
- Children: Marthe Vogt; Marguerite Vogt
- Awards: Election to the German Academy of Sciences Leopoldina, National Prize of East Germany
- Scientific career
- Fields: Neuroscience
- Workplaces: Kaiser Wilhelm Institute, now the Max Planck Institute for Brain Research, University of Berlin
- Doctoral advisor: Pierre Marie

Cécile Vogt-Mugnier (27 March 1875 – 4 May 1962) was a French neurologist from Haute-Savoie. She and her husband Oskar Vogt are known for their extensive cytoarchetecture studies on the brain.

== Professional life ==
=== Education and career ===
Vogt-Mugnier obtained her medical doctorate in Paris in 1900 and studied under Pierre Marie at the Bicêtre Hospital. At the time, women only made up 6% of those receiving medical doctorates, even though it had been thirty years since women were first admitted to medical studies. Vogt-Mugnier and her husband's findings on myelinogenesis led to her dissertation work on the fiber systems in the cat cerebral cortex (Étude sur la myelination of hémishères cérébraux) and the beginning of their research in architectonics. In Berlin, Vogt-Mugnier was awarded her medical license on January 16, 1920. Because of her scientific achievements and medical experience, she was not required to sit examinations or undergo the year of practical training.

Despite her accomplishments, Vogt-Mugnier's own career and recognition remained minimal. It was only between the years 1919 and 1937 that she held a formal, paid position as a scientist at the Kaiser Wilhelm Institute. Her position as department head corresponded to that of an extraordinary professor. For most of her life, however, she worked without compensation, and lived on her husband's earnings.

=== Research contributions ===
Vogt-Mugnier and her husband's main interest was the identification and characterization of distinct regions in the neocortex by both functional and structural criteria. The Vogts were attempting to precisely locate the regions in the cerebral cortex that correlate with specific brain functions. This also motivated their experimental work on electrostimulation of the cortices in 150 monkeys. In this endeavor, they collaborated with Korbinian Brodmann to map areas of the cortex and the thalamus.

The first publication produced from the couple's collaboration was a monograph of the myelination of the anterior part of the brain in the cat. The finding led to the Vogts' questioning of the German neurologist Paul Flechsig's doctrine of association centers. Together they pursued advanced neuropathological research, publishing their findings on both cyto- and myelo-architecture in the central nervous system and on the functional anatomy of the basal ganglia.

In 1909, Vogt-Mugnier published La myelocytoarchitecture du thalamus du cercopithèque (Myelocytoarchitecture of the Thalamus of the Cercopithecus), in which she reported her experiments in tracing afferent fibers to the thalamic ventral nuclear group.

In 1911, Vogt-Mugnier rediscovered the so-called 'status marmoratus' of the corpus striatum, characterized by slow, writhing, purposeless movements mainly affecting the hands and face. This syndrome had already been described by Gabriel Anton in 1896, however his paper attracted little attention whereas Vogt-Mugnier's report brought it to the forefront of research in basal ganglia pathology. Vogt-Mugnier continued to lead the pioneering work on the neuroanatomy of the thalamus and together with Hermann Oppenheim published their findings on hereditary palsy and double athetosis, in which she noted the mottled appearance of the striatum.

In 1922, the Vogts defined the concept of pathoclisis through their research on insects and the human cerebral cortex.

In January 1923, the Vogts traveled to Moscow to participate in the First All-Russian Congress for Psychoneurology. While there, they delivered a lecture on 'pathoarchitectonics and pathoclisis' and reported on their twenty-five years of experience in investigating the structures of the cerebral cortex.

After 1933 the Vogts collided with the Nazi regime over their Russian contacts and their fierce defense of their scientific independence and their collaborators, forcing Oskar to retire from their brain research institute in Berlin. However, they were able to continue their work on a smaller scale in Neustadt.

=== Foundation of research institutes ===
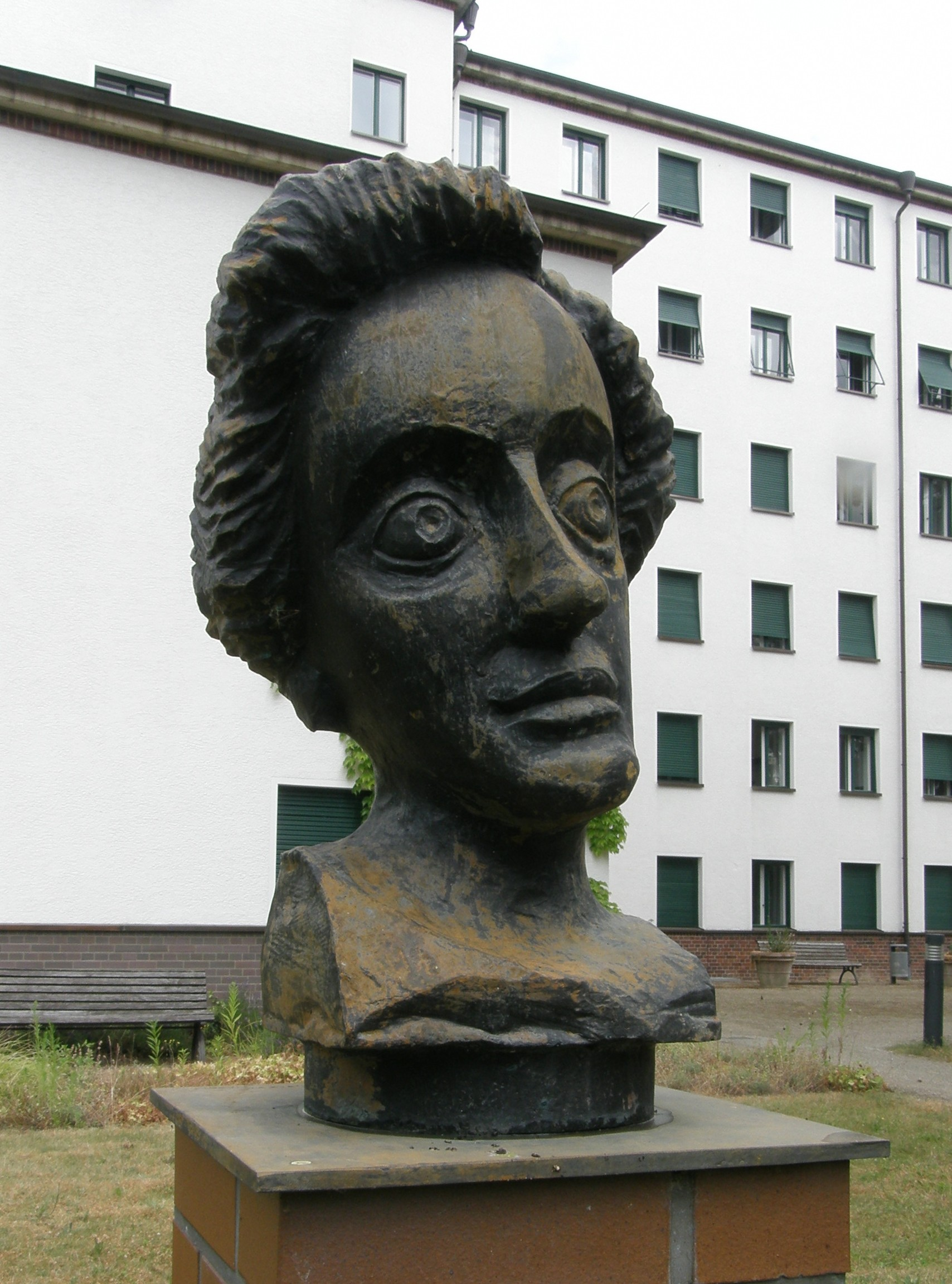
Bronze bust of Cécile Vogt-Mugnier located in the biomedical Berlin-Buch Campus at the former Institute for Brain Research.

In 1898, the Vogts founded a private research institute called the Neurologische Zentralstation (Neurological Center) in Berlin, which was formally associated with the Physiological Institute of the Charité as the Neurobiological Laboratory of the Berlin University in 1902. This institute served as the basis for the 1914 formation of the Kaiser Institut für Hirnforschung (Kaiser Wilhelm Institute for Brain Research), of which Oskar was a director. This institute also gave rise to the Max Planck Institute for Brain Research in 1945.

In 1936, Vogt-Mugnier accompanied her husband to Southern Germany where they established the Institut für Hirnforschung und allgemeine Biologie (Institute of Brain Research and General Biology) in Neustadt.

In 1959, the Vogts founded the Cécile and Oskar Vogt Institute for Brain Research. This was taken over in 1964 by the University of Düsseldorf and remains one of the largest collections of brain slices in the world.

Despite never achieving a formal position of power in these institutes, Vogt-Mugnier was described by former collaborator Adolf Hopf as having significant control over the organizational work:

[She took on] not merely the difficult tasks of administration and financing but also the internal organisation of the institute down to the last detail. She made sure that the methods of brain study met and maintained the highest standards. The collection of animal and human brain sections, the largest in the world... was in a sense her personal property; she was familiar with each case and each section; without her help, many staff members would not have been able to use the collection.

=== Honors and accomplishments ===
In 1924, Vogt-Mugnier became co-editor of the Journal für Psychologie und Neurologie (Journal for Psychology and Neurology) along with her husband. The journal appeared under their joint direction after 1954 as the Journal für Hirnforschung (Journal for Brain Research), published by the Akademie Verlag in East Berlin.

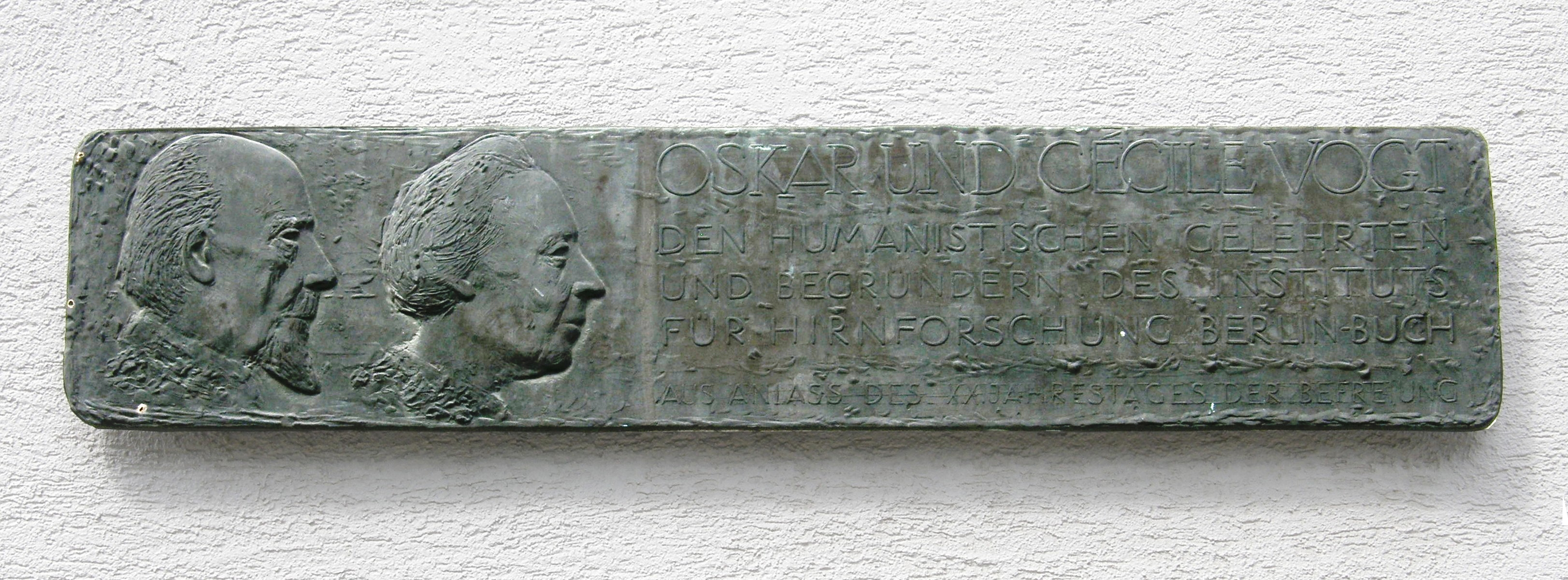
Plaque for Oskar and Cécile Vogt on the building of the Institute for Brain Research in Berlin-Buch. The plaque was created in 1965 by sculptor Axel Schulz.

In 1932 Vogt-Mugnier received her highest scientific recognition when she and her husband were both elected into the German Academy of Sciences Leopoldina at Halle, the highest academic distinction given by an institution in Germany, with members including 169 Nobel laureates. In 1950, she and Oskar were awarded with the First Class National Prize of East Germany, and she became a member of the German Academy of Sciences at Berlin. Vogt-Mugnier also received honorary doctorates from the Universities of Freiburg and Jena and the Humboldt University of Berlin.

The Vogt couple later received public attention through the novel Lenin's Brain by Tilman Spengler (1991), as Oscar Vogt received the honorary assignment of investigating the brain of Lenin after his death. In 1998, Helga Satzinger published the book Die Geschichte der genetisch orientierten Hirnforschung von Cécile und Oskar Vogt in der Zeit von 1895 bis ca. 1927 (The history of genetically oriented brain research by Cécile and Oskar Vogt from 1895 to circa 1927) documenting their work.

== Personal life ==
=== Early life ===
Cécile Vogt-Mugnier was born Augustine Marie Cécile Mugnier in Annecy, France and she lost her father when she was only two years old. A wealthy and devoutly religious aunt paid for her education at a convent school, but Cécile rebelled against the system shortly after her first communion. Disinherited, she returned to live with her mother but continued with her studies. She prepared for her baccalauréat examinations with private teachers and obtained a bachelor's degree in science. At the age of eighteen she became one of the very few women to be admitted to the medical school in Paris.

=== Family ===
In 1897, 22-year-old Cécile Vogt-Mugnier found herself pregnant, unmarried, and in the middle of earning a medical degree. While at Bicêtre Vogt-Mugnier met her future husband, Oskar Vogt, when he came to Paris to work with Joseph Jules Déjérine (and his wife, Augusta Marie Dejerine-Klumke, who collaborated with him). Little is known about their first meetings in 1898, except that they hardly understood each other's language. They married against Oskar's mother's wishes in 1899. The Vogt couple collaborated on their research for sixty years, usually with Cécile as the primary author. The Vogts had three daughters, all accomplished scientists in their own rights.

- Claire Vogt (1898-1978) was a illegitimate daughter of Vogt-Mugnier born out of wedlock by an unknown father. At the age of 4 she is recognized by Oskar Vogt as her daughter. She was a pioneering pediatric neurologist and neuropsychiatrist in Paris.
- Marthe Vogt (1903–2003) was a neuropharmacologist who became a Fellow of the Royal Society and a professor at Cambridge.
- Marguerite Vogt (1913–2007) started as a developmental geneticist working in Drosophila, then moved to the US in 1950. She developed methods to culture poliovirus with Renato Dulbecco. She was a faculty member at The Salk Institute for Biological Studies where she worked on viral transformation and cellular immortalization of cancer cells.

=== Personality ===
As a young child, Vogt-Mugnier was described as already having "an independent and unconventional mind". The neurologist Igor Klatzo, who worked with Vogt at the brain research institute in Schwarzwald (from 1946 to 1949), described her as a liberal woman with humanistic ideals:

I must admit that Cécile influenced me and my development. It was not just a question of scientific things but more about understanding and enjoying life. She taught, for example, the philosophy of a French meal, how the wines should be selected for the different phases. She had a very generous, philosophic view of the problems of life, both in family and everyday work. She was a teacher in the art of living, of which she could give any a good advice... She was probably the most intelligent person I ever met.

According to Klatzo many thought that Vogt-Mugnier was the most distinguished of the Vogt couple and that it was she who had developed the basic ideas for their work on the basal ganglia. Despite this, she remained in the background, taking on the role of caring wife and mother, supporting Oskar and defending his actions.

The neurosurgeon Wilder Penfield met the couple in 1928 and recalled Vogt-Mugnier:

Oskar Vogt's wife listens while she looks at something remote with her widely separated eyes and laughs. She is tall and she laughs almost continuously. She seems unaware that her glasses are about to fall off her nose, that the maid makes noises with things at the table so her husband has to correct her. Her attention is eagerly on one thing – her husband's unstoppable flow of learned conversation.

Her intelligence often surprised people and left those who encountered her with a lasting impression:

It was not easy to get close, on a human level, to Dr Cécile Vogt's highly intellectual nature. Her profound understanding of human beings was paired with a probing analysis, which many a visitor or staff member found it difficult to withstand. This cool matter-of-fact manner concealed a warm heart, however.

== Late life ==
Later in their career, the Vogts turned their focus to genetics, experimenting with insects that they had collected on their holiday trips to the Caucasus, the Balkans, North Africa, and the Balearic Islands. Their younger daughter Marguerite pursued this research for some ten years before departing to California.

They continued their work until Oskar died in 1959, and after the death of her husband Vogt-Mugnier moved to Cambridge, England to be with their elder daughter Marthe. Cécile died there in 1962.
