= Marguerite Vogt =

Cancer biologist

- Vogt in 1938
- Born: 13 February 1913; Germany
- Died: 6 July 2007 (aged 94); La Jolla, California, US
- Education: University of Berlin (MD)
- Scientific career
- Fields: Biology, virology
- Workplaces: California Institute of Technology

Marguerite Vogt (13 February 1913 – 6 July 2007) was a cancer biologist and virologist. She was most noted for her research on polio and cancer at the Salk Institute for Biological Studies.

== Early life ==
Vogt was born in Germany in 1913. The youngest daughter of Oskar Vogt and French-born Cécile Vogt-Mugnier, Vogt took her M.D. degree from the University of Berlin in 1937. Her parents were prominent neuroscientists and she grew up in an intense scientific environment. Her older sister, Marthe Vogt (1903–2003) was a neuropharmacologist who became a fellow of the Royal Society and a professor at Cambridge.

== Career ==
Vogt joined her parents at a private institute in Neustadt, the Black Forest, where the family lived for the duration of World War II; there, she worked extensively on Drosophila development. She published over 30 papers on the ring gland and homeotic mutants.

Vogt moved to the California Institute of Technology in 1950 to work with Max Delbrück. He introduced her to Renato Dulbecco, a junior faculty member in the division of biology and together, Vogt and Dulbecco worked on methods to culture poliovirus. They were the first to successfully grow the virus in vitro and were able to plaque purify it, an essential step for subsequent vaccine production. Vogt's technical abilities as a cell culturist were critical to this work. This resulted in a classic paper. They next turned their attention to cancer-causing viruses, beginning with the polyoma virus. They were able to culture this virus and examine its latency, resulting in another classic study.

Dulbecco was recruited to the newly founded Salk Institute for Biological Studies in 1963, and Vogt joined him as a research fellow in his group. They continued their work on tumor-causing viruses. However, their interests diverged, and in 1973, Vogt was appointed as a research professor, which was an independent position that allowed her to pursue her interest in the origins of cancer. Her interests evolved to examining cellular immortalization in cancer cells, and the role of telomeres in this process. She published her last paper in 1998.

Vogt made significant contributions as a scientist in multiple areas: as a Drosophila developmental geneticist, as a virologist working with Nobel laureate Renato Dulbecco, and as an investigator into viral transformation and cellular immortalization. Moreover, she was an influential mentor and colleague to many junior scientists, among them several future Nobel laureates. Her work was never recognized by a major prize, though this is widely viewed as an oversight. She was noted for her dedication and was busy in her lab even into her 80s.

She died on 6 July 2007, at her home in La Jolla, California, aged 94.
