= Psophometric voltage =

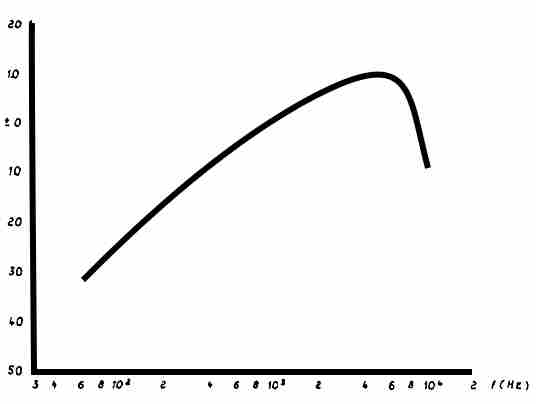
The weighing curve of the CCIF 1951

Psophometric voltage is a circuit noise voltage measured with a psophometer that includes a CCIF-1951 weighting network.

"Psophometric voltage" should not be confused with "psophometric emf," i.e., the emf in a generator or line with 600 Ω internal resistance. For practical purposes, the psophometric emf is twice the corresponding psophometric voltage.

Psophometric voltage readings, V, in millivolts, are commonly converted to dBm(psoph) by dBm(psoph) = 20 log_{10}V – 57.78.
