= Pathoclisis =

Pathoclisis (from -clisis meaning "predisposition" in Ancient Greek) is the theory that certain specialized parts of the brain are the first to be damaged in the case of disease, lack of oxygen, or malnutrition. The selective vulnerability of certain neurons can then lead to the expression of pathology. The APA dictionary of psychology defines pathoclisis as “sensitivity to particular toxins, or the tendency of particular toxins to target certain organs or systems of organ.”

Pathoclisis has been postulated to mediate the sensory effects of a near-death experience.

== Research ==
Cécile Vogt-Mugnier and her husband Oskar Vogt came up with the idea of pathoclisis through their research on insects and the human cerebral cortex. They defined it as the "genomically-determined excessive variability, reaching in intensity the degree of pathological change".

During their work in France and Germany, these prominent scientists of neurological research first experimented on animals, administering pharmacological agents and using electricity to observe electrical and functional disturbances. After also experimenting with human brains, their findings presented a case that certain factors influence patterns of pathoclisis in different brain regions.

== Different types of pathoclisis ==
Upon their discovery of pathoclisis, Cécile Vogt-Mugnier and her husband Oskar Vogt decided to categorize and classify the disease into many subcategories. One of the main separations was between "soma" pathoclisis and "gene pathoclisis. “Soma” refers to how vulnerable a section of the brain can be when it comes in contact with a damaging substance or situation, such as carbon monoxide or a lack of oxygen. “Gene” has to do with hereditary genes deteriorating due to an outside circumstance or near-death experience. Upon further research, certain mental disorders were traceable to this effect, with schizophrenia being one example.

The other division was between general pathoclisis and special pathoclisis. “General” referred to the conclusion that one specific part of the brain could be affected by a multitude of factors including poisonings, malnutrition, paralysis, lack of nutrients, and even certain types of dementia. On the other hand, “special” referred to there being a specific connection between the location of deterioration and the factor that caused it.

== Near-death experiences ==
When close to death, certain parts of the brain may experience a lack of oxygen and through pathoclisis, specific structures of the brain are affected. These structures contribute to the creation of commonly experienced phenomena when near death.

Experience	Neurological Symptoms	Involved Brain Structures
Sounds	Acouasms, tinnitus cerebri (audio hallucinations)	Temporal Lobe
tunnels	Visual field narrows	Occipital lobe
Light and patterns	Phosphenes (visual illusion) photopsia (visions of light flashes)	Occipital lobe
“Life flash before eyes”	Visual hallucinations	Occipital lobe
Seeing own body	Autoscopy (out of body experience)	Temporal lobe
Sense of time		Temporal lobe
Feelings of love and warmth		Limbic system
Seeing loved ones	Visual hallucinations	Occipital Lobe

Some near death experiences such as seeing light or having out of body experiences have been reported more commonly. This supports the idea of pathoclisis, an effect of being near death that is shared among humans in which some brain structures are more susceptible to malfunction and are affected first with lack of oxygen.

== Mechanism ==
More so than any other organ, the brain is remarkably heterogeneous in its cellular composition. The wide variety of cell types might thus be the basis for selective vulnerability.

The brain has many structures and pathoclisis implies the tendency for some of these regions to be more vulnerable and become affected first when encountering a lack of oxygen. To comprehend the concept of pathoclisis, it is necessary to understand the temporal sequence that leads to the death of an organ. This sequence is characterized chronologically by; Disturbance of function, small amount of cell loss, large amount cell loss and therefore damage to part of an organ, damage to entirety of an organ, full loss of organ function, organ death.

Regions of the brain that have been found to be most vulnerable to a lack of oxygen or glucose include the cerebral and cerebellar cortex, thalamus, structures in the striatum, Ammon's horn, lower olivary body of the medulla oblongata, and in the occipital lobe.

The gray matter of the cerebral cortex is the first to begin shrinking as aging progresses. Based on MRI studies however, researchers are beginning to realize that this brain aging may not be as random as they had assumed. Seemingly healthy, older individuals are showing signs of cerebral atrophy, which leads to the conclusion that brain deterioration is specific and dependent. The prefrontal, parietal, and occipital lobes tend to be the first to begin the decline in health. Sections of the brain that deal with higher-order concepts tend to age in line with the body more so than other areas.

A possible explanation for pathoclisis is distribution of neurotransmitters affects vulnerability. Another hypothesis is that the circulation of certain regions influences their susceptibility to disturbance and damage.

== Role in neurodegenerative diseases ==
Subcortical structures, such as basal ganglia and the brain stem, are particularly vulnerable to ATP depletion, explaining why parkinsonism and depressive symptoms are among the earliest symptoms of vascular dementia, hypoxia, carbon monoxide poisoning, chronic intoxication by mitochondrial complex I inhibitors (such as rotenone and annonaceous acetogenins) and chronic traumatic encephalopathy.

Especially, progressive supranuclear palsy and corticobasal degeneration seems to be illnesses resulting from mitochondrial complex I deficiency.

Additionally, hypoxia during childhood seems to be a factor of schizophrenia, due to corticobasal and cerebellar damage to the brain.

Today, the theory of pathoclisis is used in Alzheimer's research, as both relate to the degeneration of the brain and in alzheimer's certain parts of the brain are affected before others, while some are left unaffected. It has also been explored in sporadic parkinson's disease, as patients with the disease have shown to have the molecular basis for pathoclisis.
