= Marthe Vogt =

German neuroscientist (1903–2003)

- Born: September 8, 1903; Berlin, German Empire
- Died: September 9, 2003 (aged 100); La Jolla, California, U.S.
- Known for: Neurotransmitters
- Awards: Royal Medal (1981)
- Scientific career
- Fields: Neurology

Marthe Louise Vogt (September 8, 1903 – September 9, 2003) was a German scientist recognized as one of the leading neuroscientists of the twentieth century. She is mainly remembered for her important contributions to the understanding of the role of neurotransmitters in the brain, especially epinephrine.

== Early life and education ==
Vogt was born in Berlin, the daughter of two of Germany's leading anatomists, Cécile and Oskar Vogt (French and Danish-German respectively). She was the older sister of Marguerite Vogt.

Marthe studied medicine and chemistry at Berlin University (1922–1927), earning her degree as Doctor of Medicine with research on the microscopial anatomy of the human brain. She also earned a D.Phil in chemistry for research in biochemistry on carbohydrate metabolism at the Kaiser Wilhelm Institut für Biochemie under C. Neuberg (1927–1929).

== Career ==
In 1929, she began work on pharmacology and endocrinology in the Institute of Pharmacology in Berlin under Paul Trendelenburg, where she met Edith Bülbring and Wilhelm Feldberg and where Paul Trendelenburg's son Ullrich became her friend for life. Here Vogt learned about endocrinology and used experimental techniques in pharmacological analysis. By the early 1930s, she had established a reputation as one of Germany's leading pharmacologists, and in 1931, aged just 28, was appointed head of the chemical division at the Kaiser Wilhelm Institut für Hirnforschung ("Brain Science"). Her work focused on the central nervous system and the effects of various drugs on the brain.

With Nazism on the rise throughout Germany, Vogt and other German scientists (including Edith Bulbring), decided that a move to Britain would be greatly beneficial, and in 1935 she arrived on a Rockefeller Travelling Fellowship in England. Vogt joined the British Pharmacological Society and began work with Sir Henry Dale at the National Institute for Medical Research, London. Vogt coauthored a paper with Dale and Wilhelm Feldberg: 'Release of Acetylcholine at Voluntary Motor Nerve Endings' in 1936. Sir Henry Dale was awarded the Nobel Prize for Physiology or Medicine in 1936 based on the work described in this paper, and he credited Feldberg and Vogt in his lecture.

In late 1935, for the second half of her Rockefeller Traveling Fellowship, Marthe Vogt began work in Cambridge on the relationship of blood pressure to substances from the ischaemic kidney with Professor E.B. Varney, with additional funding grants from the Royal Society. She was also awarded the Alfred Yarrow Research Fellowship of Girton College the next year. In 1938 she was awarded an honorary doctorate from Cambridge, where she was a demonstrator in pharmacology and physiology.

Unfortunately, the politics of World War II threatened her career. Her German nationality led to an investigation by British intelligence services in 1940, who categorized her as a category A enemy alien because Nazi officials would not accept her resignation from a permanent appointment when she left Germany. She was brought before a tribunal which ruled for her immediate internment. However, Vogt's colleagues and friends rallied to her aid and an appeal was granted, freeing her to continue her work at Cambridge.

Vogt remained at Cambridge for five years, working on topics in hypertension and adrenal gland function. In 1947, Vogt became a lecturer and later reader in pharmacology at Edinburgh University, where she continued work on transmitter substances, publishing research on serotonin and reserpine. In 1948, Vogt published a seminal work with William Feldberg: "Acetylcholine synthesis in different regions of the central nervous system". The paper provides the earliest evidence for the role of acetylcholine as a neurotransmitter and demonstrated the regional distribution of cholinergic systems in the brain.

She was a visiting professor at Columbia University, New York in 1949. Over the next thirty years, Vogt would divide her time between Cambridge, London and Edinburgh, and in 1960 she moved back to Cambridge once more to head the Pharmacology Unit at the Babraham Institute, retiring in 1968. She continued research there until 1990.

== Publications ==
- Dale, H.H.; Feldberg, W.; Vogt, M. (1936). "Release of Acetylcholine at Voluntary Motor Nerve Endings". Journal of Physiology. 86 (4): 353–380. doi:10.1113/jphysiol.1936.sp003371. PMC 1394683. PMID 16994763.
- Feldberg, W.; Vogt, M. (1948). "Acetylcholine synthesis in different regions of the central nervous system". Journal of Physiology. 107 (3): 372–381. doi:10.1113/jphysiol.1948.sp004282. PMC 1392171. PMID 16991818.
- Muscholl, Erich; Vogt, Marthe (1958). "The action of reserpine on the peripheral sympathetic system". Journal of Physiology. 141 (1): 132–155. doi:10.1113/jphysiol.1958.sp005961. PMC 1358822. PMID 13539826.

== Awards ==
Throughout her life Marthe Vogt received numerous accolades from many scientific institutions. In 1952 she was elected as a Fellow of the Royal Society and in 1981 she was awarded the Royal Medal of the Society. She also held honorary doctorates from Edinburgh and Cambridge. She was elected a Foreign Honorary Member of the American Academy of Arts and Sciences.

== Later life ==
Marthe Vogt later relocated to La Jolla, California in 1988 to live with her sister, noted cancer biologist Marguerite Vogt (1913–2007). Marthe Vogt died the day after her 100th birthday in 2003.
