= Psophometer =

Instrument to measure telephone circuit noise

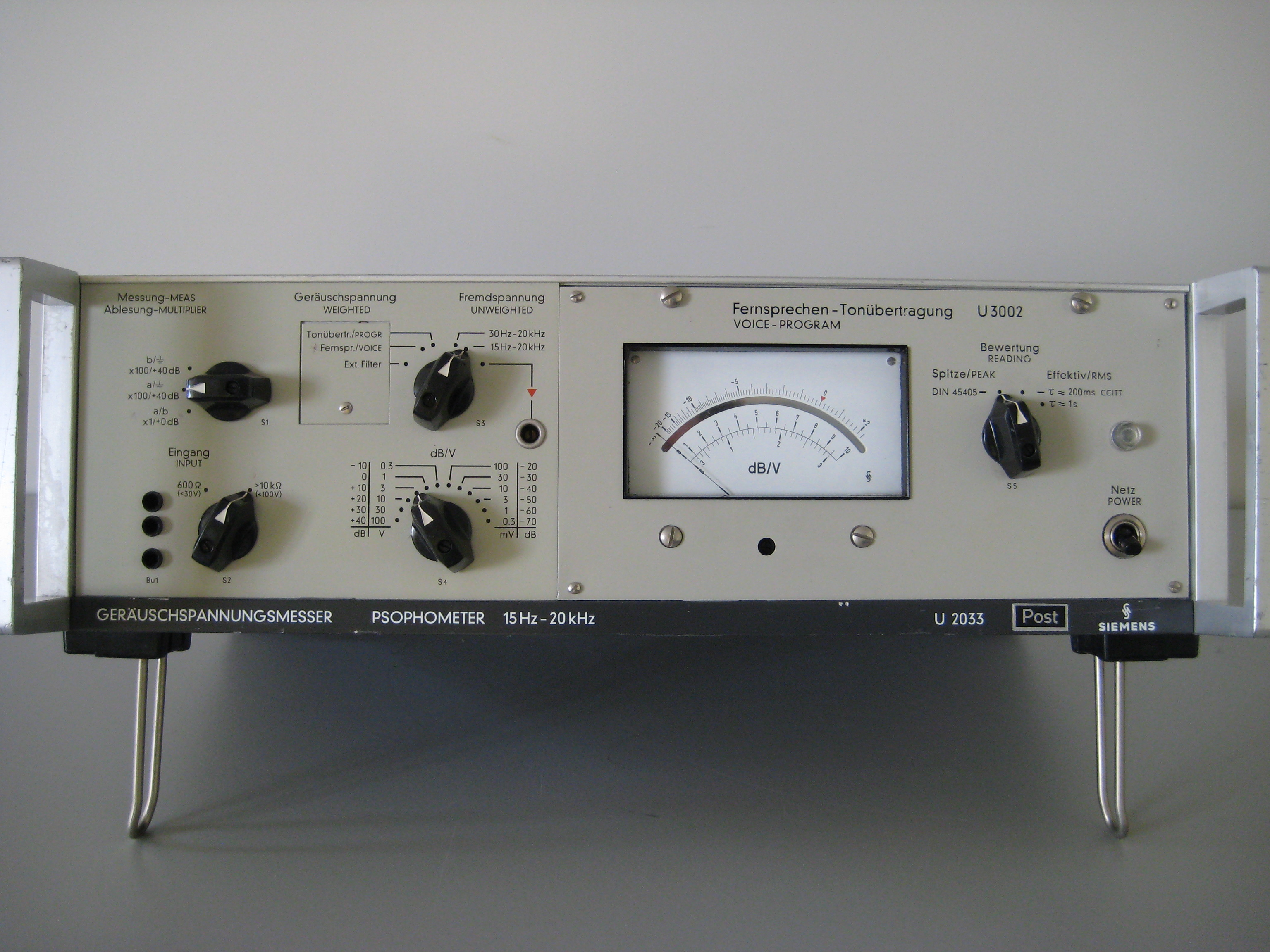
Psophometer

In telecommunications, a psophometer is an instrument that measures the perceptible noise of a telephone circuit.

The core of the meter is based on a true RMS voltmeter, which measures the level of the noise signal. This was used for the first psophometers, in the 1930s. As the human-perceived level of noise is more important for telephony than their raw voltage, a modern psophometer incorporates a weighting network to represent this perception. The characteristics of the weighting network depend on the type of circuit under investigation, such as whether the circuit is used to normal speech standards (300 Hz – 3.3 kHz), or for high-fidelity broadcast-quality sound (50 Hz – 15 kHz).

== Etymology ==
The name was coined in the 1930s, on a basis from Ancient Greek: ψόφος, romanized: psóphos, lit. 'noise', itself derived from Ancient Greek: ψό, lit. 'an exclamation of disgust'. It is unrelated to Ancient Greek: σοφός, romanized: sóphos, lit. 'wisdom'.

The '-meter' suffix Ancient Greek: μέτρον, romanized: métron, lit. 'tool for measuring' was already widely used in English, but also derives originally from Greek.

== See also ==
- Psophometric voltage
