= Oskar Vogt =

German physician and neurologist

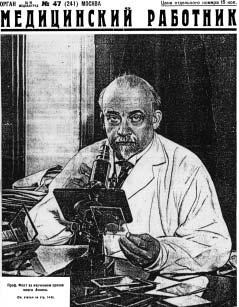
Professor Vogt investigating histological sections from Lenin's brain.

Oskar Vogt (6 April 1870 in Husum – 30 July 1959 in Freiburg im Breisgau) was a German physician and neurologist. He and his wife Cécile Vogt-Mugnier are known for their extensive cytoarchetectonic studies on the brain.

== Personal life ==
Vogt was born in Husum, Schleswig-Holstein, Germany. He studied at the local Husum grammar school before entering universities. Vogt studied medicine at the University of Kiel and University of Jena, eventually obtaining his doctorate from Jena in 1894.

The Vogts met in 1897 in Paris, and eventually married in 1899. The Vogts were close to the Krupp family. Friedrich Alfred Krupp financially supported them, and in 1898, Oskar and Cécile founded a private research institute called the Neurologische Zentralstation (Neurological Center) in Berlin, which was formally associated with the Physiological Institute of the Charité as the Neurobiological Laboratory of the Berlin University in 1902. This institute served as the basis for the 1914 formation of the Kaiser Institut für Hirnforschung (Kaiser Wilhelm Institute for Brain Research), of which Oskar was a director. There, he had students from many countries who went on to prominent careers including Jerzy Rose (mentor of Michael Merzenich), Valentino Braitenberg (mentor of Christof Koch), Korbinian Brodmann, Rafael Lorente de Nó and Harald Brockhaus. This institute gave rise to the Max Planck Institute for Brain Research in 1945.

As a clinician, Vogt used hypnotism (Stuckrade-Barre and Danek 2004) until 1903 and wrote papers on the topic. In particular, Vogt had an intense interest for localizing the origins of "genius" or traits in the brain.

=== Family ===
Vogt married the French neurologist Cécile Mugnier. They met in Paris in 1897 while he was there working with Joseph Jules Dejerine and his wife, Augusta Marie Dejerine-Klumke, who collaborated with him. Because of their similar scholarly interests, the Vogts collaborated for a long period, usually with Cécile as the primary author.

The Vogts had two daughters, both accomplished scientists in their own right:

- Marthe Vogt (1903–2003) was a neuropharmacologist who became a Fellow of the Royal Society and a professor at Cambridge.
- Marguerite Vogt (1913–2007) started as a developmental geneticist working in Drosophila, then moved to the US in 1950. She developed methods to culture poliovirus with Renato Dulbecco. She was a faculty member at The Salk Institute for Biological Studies where she worked on viral transformation and cellular immortalization of cancer cells.

=== Politics ===
Vogt was a socialist, involved with the factions led by Mme Fessard who knew him personally, and with the guesdist element of the French socialist party (Jules Guesde was at the far left wing of this party). He was never a Communist, although he did interact with the Soviets on a number of occasions. They sent him several researchers, including N. V. Timofeev-Resovskij (whom Solzhenitsyn met in the Gulag). He helped to establish the brain institute in Moscow.

Vogt was opposed to the Nazi Party. Gustav Krupp von Bohlen und Halbach helped fund a small hospital in Schwarzwald near Neustadt when Vogt was dismissed in 1936 from his position with the Kaiser Wilhelm Brain Research Institute.

== Institutes and journals ==
Vogt was the editor of the prominent Journal für Psychologie und Neurologie published in German, French and English which made many of the most important contributions between the two World Wars. This later became The Journal für Hirnforschung.

== Lenin's brain ==
Vogt had a longstanding interest in localizing functions in the brain.

In 1924, Vogt was one of the neurologists asked to consult on Lenin’s illness and was given his brain for histological study after Lenin's death. He found that Lenin's brain showed a great number of "giant cells", which Vogt saw as a sign of superior mental function. "The giant cells" were cortical pyramidal cells of unusual size. There were also particularities in layer 3.

In 1925 Vogt accepted an invitation to Moscow where he was assigned the establishment of an institute for brain research under the auspices of the health ministry in Moscow. Vogt got one 20 micrometer slice out of the 30,953 slices of the brain, and took it home to Berlin for research purposes. Therefore, contrary to claims of two Belgian neurologists, L. Van Bogaert and A. Dewulf, the Soviets did not have to carry out a military operation specifically to retrieve the brain before the Americans obtained it. It was, for a time, put on display in the Lenin Mausoleum. The brain is still in the Institute in Moscow.

== Contributions ==
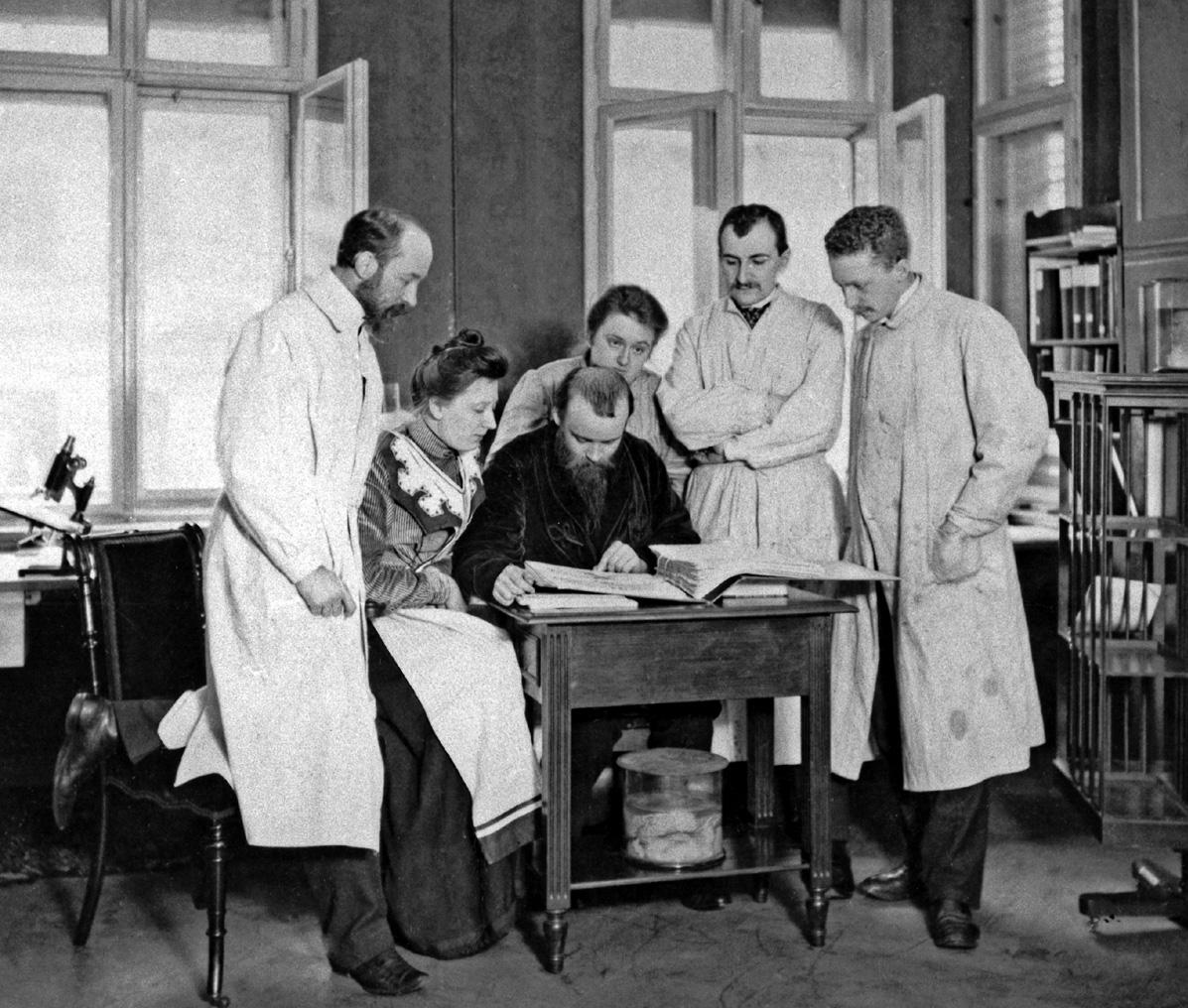
Korbinian Brodmann, Cécile Vogt-Mugnier, Oskar Vogt, Max Borcherdt, and Max Lewandowsky.

The contributions of the Vogts had lasting impact on the field of neuroscience, spanning discoveries across several brain regions, and had a considerable influence on international neurological sciences.

=== Cortex ===
An interest in the correlation between anatomy and psychology drew the Vogts to study the cortex. The Vogts imposed the distinction between iso- and allocortex. Based on their cytoarchitectonic studies, they promoted a six-layer pattern, rather than the five-layer pattern of Meynert or the seven of Cajal.

=== Thalamus ===
Vogt made several presentations of his view of the thalamus in Paris. Oskar and Cécile further referred to the work of Constantin von Monakow in a series on the anatomy of mammals. A paper published together in 1941 (Thalamus studien I to III), devoted to the human thalamus, represented an important step in partitioning and naming thalamic parts. The anatomy of the thalamus from Hassler (one of their students) was published in 1959, the year of Oskar's death. It is not known whether the master accepted the excessive partition and unnecessary complication of this work; it was an atlas dedicated to stereotacticans. The paper of 1941 was much simpler.

=== Basal ganglia ===
The Vogts greatly contributed to the analysis of what is known today as the basal ganglia system. Their main interest was on the striatum, which they named following a proposal by Foix and Nicolesco in 1941. This includes the caudate nucleus, the putamen, and the fundus.

=== Entomology ===
Oskar Vogt was also an entomologist. He was particularly interested in bumblebees and in the study of variation; he introduced the term ‘eunomic series’. His collections (ca. 400,000 specimens, including ca. 300,000 bumblebees) have been deposited in the Zoological Museum in Amsterdam.

== Eponym ==
The Vogt-Vogt syndrome is an extrapyramidal disturbance with double sided athetosis occurring in early childhood.

== Gallery ==
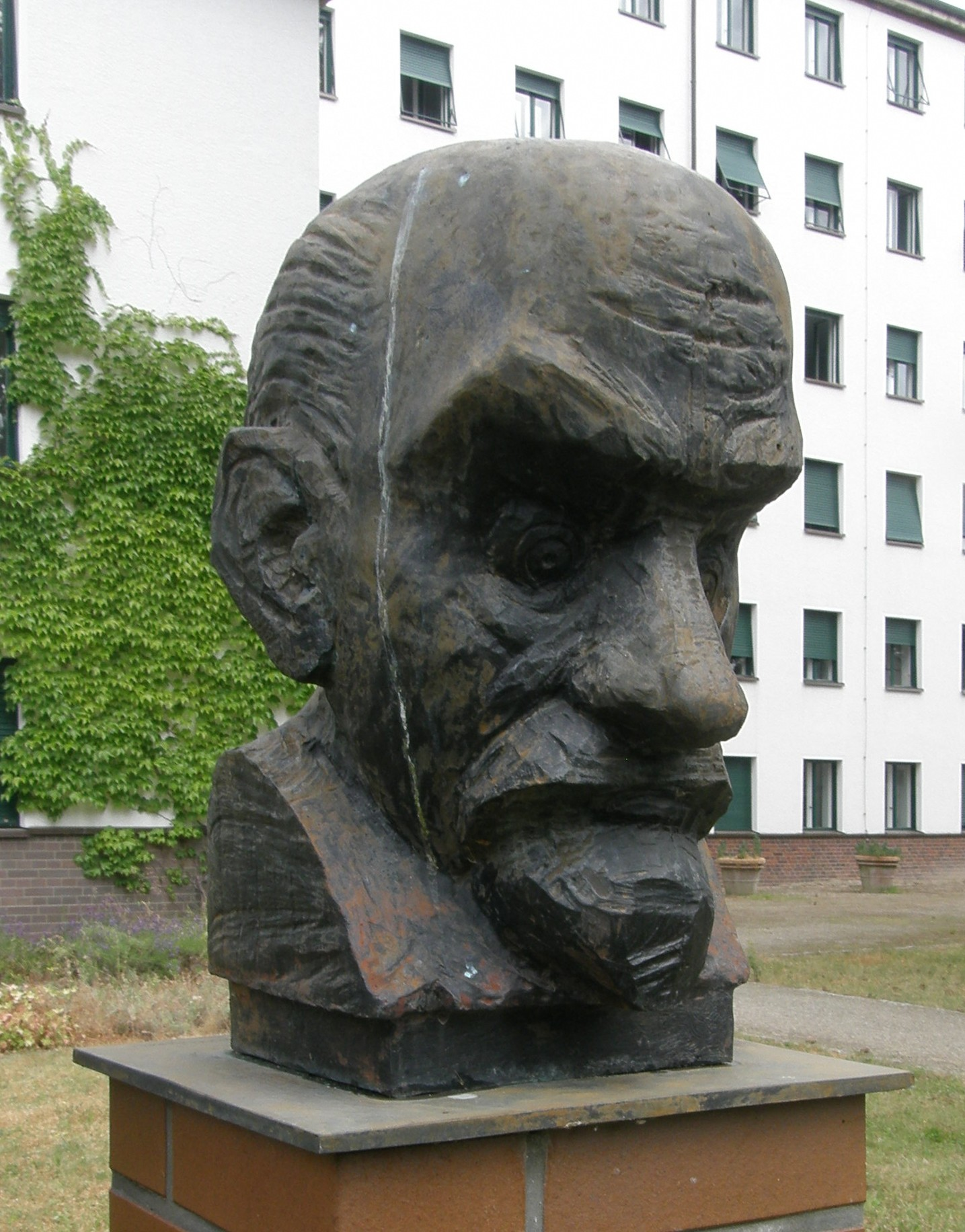
Bronze bust of Oskar Vogt located in the biomedical Berlin-Buch Campus at the former Institute for Brain Research.

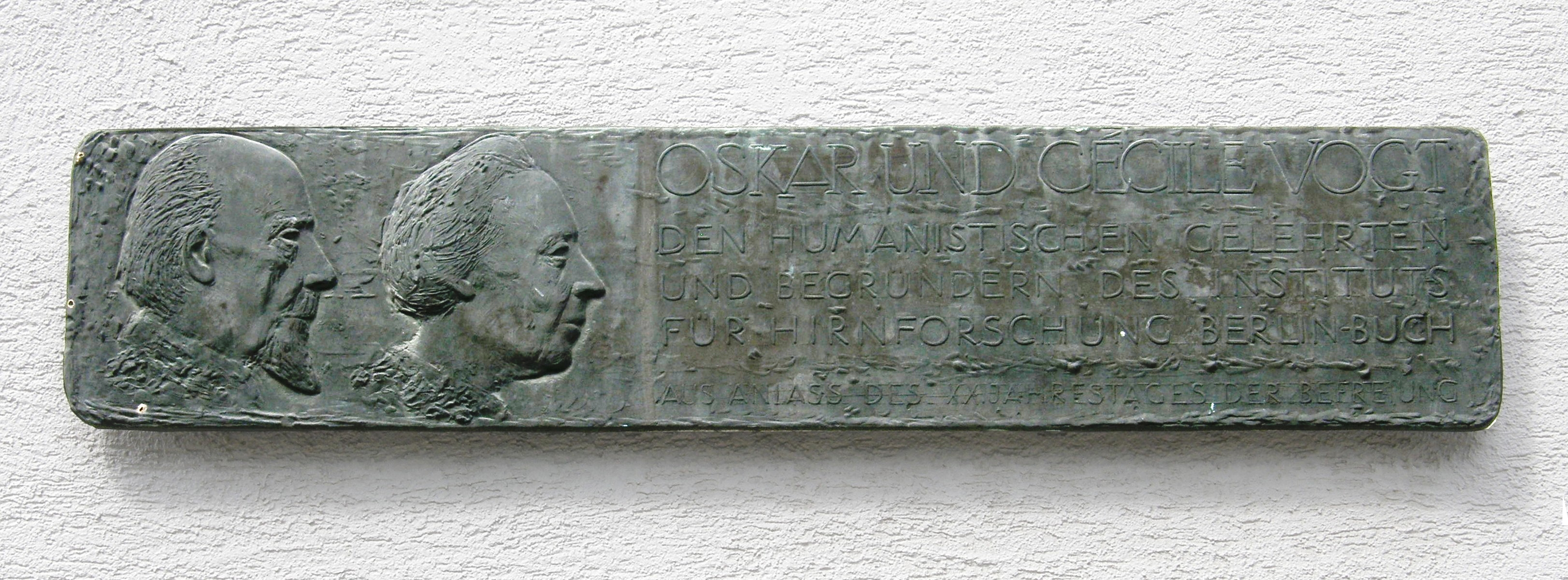
Plaque for Oskar and Cécile Vogt on the building of the Institute for Brain Research in Berlin-Buch. The plaque was created in 1965 by sculptor Axel Schulz.

== Awards ==
- 1950 — National Award GRD
