= Pentalpha =

Puzzle involving stones and a pentagram

Solution

Pentalpha is a puzzle where the goal is to place nine stones on the ten intersections of a pentagram. The puzzle is used as a confidence trick in Mexico, where it is known as estrella mágica. The following rules need to be obeyed when placing the stones:

1. The stone has to visit two other points before reaching its final point.
2. These three points have to be next to each other.
3. The points have to be in a straight line.
4. Although the second (middle) point is allowed to be occupied by a stone, the first (starting) and third (ending) points must be clear before a stone is placed at the third (ending) point.

== Solution ==
The solution to Pentalpha can be found for any starting point using the following algorithm:

1. Choose a node X.
2. Travel two nodes in a straight line to node Y.
3. From node Y, place a stone at node X.
4. Let node Y be the new node X.
5. Repeat step 2-4 until the puzzle is solved.
