= Phagophilia =

Behaviour of feeding on parasites

Phagophilia or phagophily is the behaviour of feeding on parasites. It is also an example of cleaning symbiosis.

Austrian arachnologist Max Beier reported on phagophilia in pseudoscorpions. Many pseudoscorpion species co-exist with packrat species, and two of them are known to feed on packrat ectoparasites, to mutual benefit.
