= Prosoplasia =

Prosoplasia (from Ancient Greek: πρόσω prósō, "forward" + πλάσις plasis, "formation") is the differentiation of cells either to a higher function or to a higher level of organization.

Assuming an increasing cellular peculiarity from a presupposed stem-cell fate, prosoplasia is therefore a forward differentiation, unlike anaplasia (a backward differentiation). Examples of prosoplasia include the forward differentiation of cells in the mucosa in Warthin's tumor.
