= Hydrophobia =

Hydrophobia may refer to:

== Science ==
- Aquaphobia, an irrational fear of water
- Hydrophobe, the chemical property of a molecule that is seemingly repelled from a mass of water
- Rabies, historically referred to as hydrophobia, a viral disease that causes encephalitis in humans and other mammals

== Art, entertainment, and media ==
- Hydrophobia (video game), a 2010 game developed and published by Dark Energy Digital
- Hydrophobia, a Hungarian disk magazine
- "Hydrophobia", the 13th track on the Risk of Rain 2 soundtrack album
