= Phonogram =

Phonogram may refer to:

- Phonogram (law), an alternative term for a sound recording in international copyright and related rights law
- Phonogram (comics), a comic book by Kieron Gillen and Jamie McKelvie
- Phonogram (linguistics), a grapheme which represents a phoneme or a combination of phonemes
- Phonogram Inc., a music label holding company which was launched in 1971

== See also ==
- Phonograph, a device for the mechanical recording and reproduction of sound
- Phonograph record
- Sound recording copyright
  - Sound recording copyright symbol — ℗ stands for phonogram
