= Pollakanth =

A pollakanth is a plant that reproduces, flowers and sets seed recurrently during its life. The term was first used by Frans R. Kjellman.

Other terms with the same meaning are polycarpic and iteroparous.

Its antonym is hapaxanth.
