= Pompholyx =

Pompholyx may refer to:

- Pompholyx, certain eczema, see dyshidrosis
- Pompholyx (rotifer), a genus of rotifers in the family Testudinellidae
- Pompholyx, a genus of insects in the family Pneumoridae, synonym of Prostalia
- Pompholyx, a genus of fungi in the family Sclerodermataceae, synonym of Scleroderma
