= Micropyle =

Micropyle may refer to:

- Micropyle (botany) a minute opening in the integument of an ovule of a seed plant.
- Micropyle (zoology), a differentiated area of surface in an egg, through which a sperm enters
