= Status marmoratus =

Congenital disorder

Status marmoratus is a congenital condition due to maldevelopment of the corpus striatum associated with choreoathetosis, in which the striate nuclei have a marble-like appearance caused by altered myelination in the putamen, caudate, and thalamus (there are bilateral hyperdensities restricted to the thalamus). This results from acute total asphyxia in the basal nucleus of full-term infants. It is associated with athetoid cerebral palsy and spastic quadriplegia.
