= Philophobia =

Philophobia may refer to:

- Philophobia (album), an album by the band Arab Strap
- Philophobia (fear), the fear of falling in love
