= Renato Dulbecco =

Italian-American virologist (1914–2012)

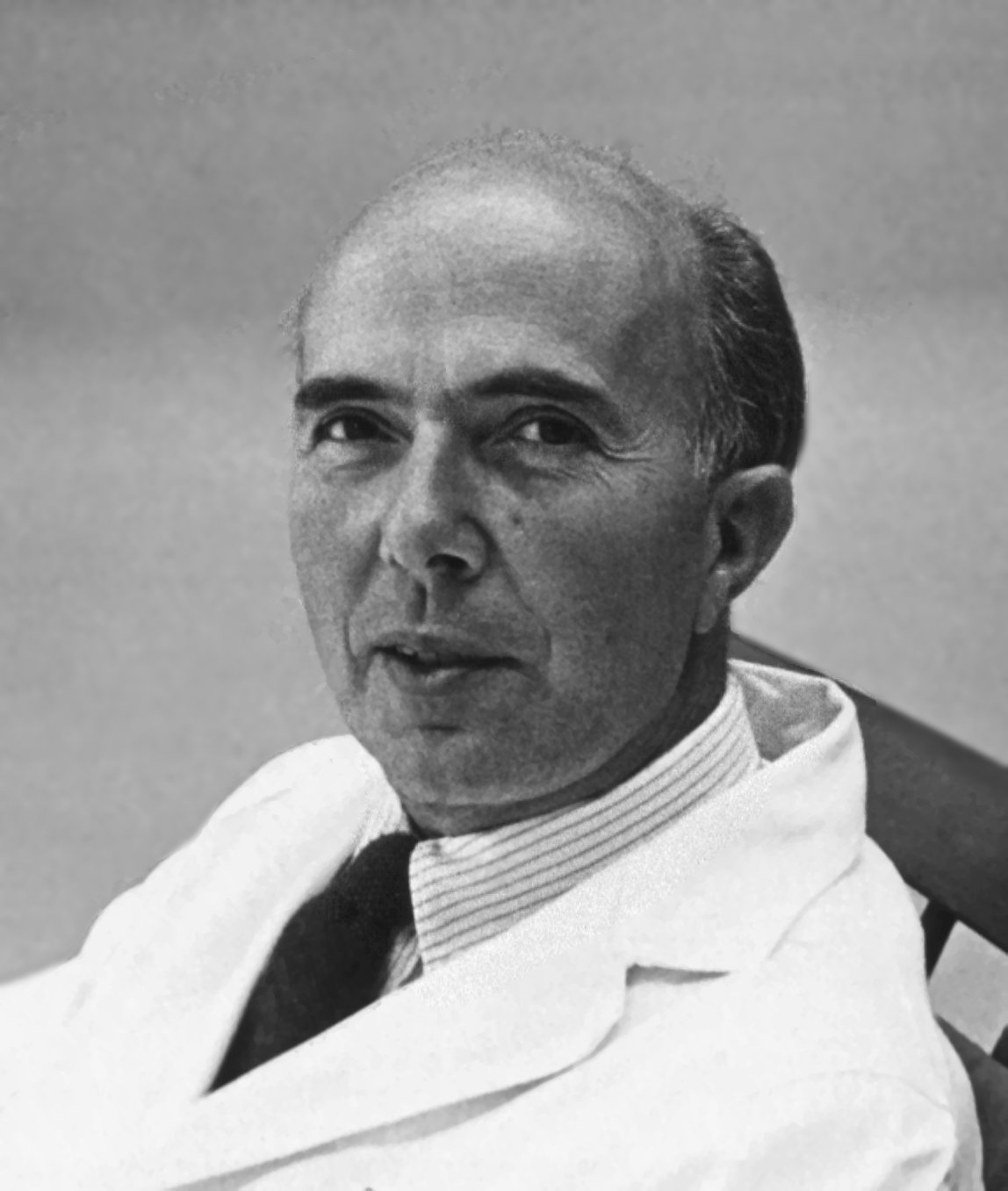
- Born: February 22, 1914; Catanzaro, Italy
- Died: February 19, 2012 (aged 97); La Jolla, California, U.S.
- Education: University of Turin
- Known for: Reverse transcriptase
- Awards: Albert Lasker Award for Basic Medical Research (1964); Paul Ehrlich and Ludwig Darmstaedter Prize (1967); Louisa Gross Horwitz Prize (1973); Selman A. Waksman Award (1974); Nobel Prize in Physiology or Medicine (1975)
- Scientific career
- Fields: Virologist
- Workplaces: Indiana University Bloomington; California Institute of Technology; Salk Institute; London Research Institute
- Doctoral students: Howard Temin

Renato Dulbecco (/dʌlˈbɛkoʊ/ dul-BEK-oh, Italian: [reˈnaːto dulˈbɛkko, -ˈbek-]; February 22, 1914 – February 19, 2012) was an Italian–American virologist who won the 1975 Nobel Prize in Physiology or Medicine for his work on oncoviruses, which are viruses that can cause cancer when they infect animal cells. He studied at the University of Turin under Giuseppe Levi, along with fellow students Salvador Luria and Rita Levi-Montalcini, who also moved to the U.S. with him and won Nobel prizes. He was drafted into the Italian army in World War II, but later joined the resistance.

== Early life ==
Dulbecco was born in Catanzaro (Calabria, Southern Italy), but spent his childhood and grew up in Liguria, in the coastal city Imperia. He graduated from high school at 16, then moved to the University of Turin. Despite a strong interest in mathematics and physics, he decided to study medicine. At only 22, he graduated in morbid anatomy and pathology under the supervision of professor Giuseppe Levi. During these years he met Salvador Luria and Rita Levi-Montalcini, whose friendship and encouragement would later bring him to the United States. In 1936 he was called up for military service as a medical officer, and later (1938) discharged. In 1940 Italy entered World War II and Dulbecco was recalled and sent to the front in France and Russia, where he was wounded. After hospitalization and the collapse of Fascism, he joined the resistance against the German occupation.

== Career and research ==
After the war he resumed his work at Levi's laboratory, but soon he moved, together with Levi-Montalcini, to the U.S., where, at Indiana University, he worked with Salvador Luria on bacteriophages. In the summer of 1949 he moved to Caltech, joining Max Delbrück's group (see Phage group). In the early 1950s, on Delbruck's advice, Dulbecco visited the major centers of animal virus work in the US in order to discover a way to quantitatively assay animal viruses by a plaque technique, similar to the technique that had recently been developed for bacterial viruses. Within less than a year, he worked out such a method for Western equine encephalitis virus, which then opened up animal virology to quantitative work. The technique was then used by Dulbecco and Vogt to study the biological properties of poliovirus. These accomplishments led to Dulbecco's appointment first to associate professor, and then to full professor at the California Institute of Technology. There he started his studies about animal oncoviruses, especially of polyoma family. In the late 1950s, he took Howard Temin as a student, with whom, and together with David Baltimore, he would later share the 1975 Nobel Prize in Physiology or Medicine for "their discoveries concerning the interaction between tumour viruses and the genetic material of the cell." Temin and Baltimore arrived at the discovery of reverse transcriptase simultaneously and independently from each other; although Dulbecco did not take direct part in either of their experiments, he had taught the two methods they used to make the discovery.

Throughout this time he also worked with Marguerite Vogt. In 1962, he moved to the Salk Institute and then in 1972 to The Imperial Cancer Research Fund (now named the Cancer Research UK London Research Institute) where he was first appointed associate professor and then full professor. Like many Italian scientists, Dulbecco did not have a PhD because it did not exist in the Italian higher education system (until it was introduced in 1980). In 1986 he was among the scientists who launched the Human Genome Project. From 1993 to 1997 he moved back to Italy, where he was president of the Institute of Biomedical Technologies at C.N.R. (National Council of Research) in Milan. He also retained his position on the faculty of Salk Institute for Biological Studies. Dulbecco was actively involved in research into identification and characterization of mammary gland cancer stem cells until December 2011. His research using a stem cell model system suggested that a single malignant cell with stem cell properties may be sufficient to induce cancer in mice and can generate distinct populations of tumor-initiating cells also with cancer stem cell properties. Dulbecco's examinations into the origin of mammary gland cancer stem cells in solid tumors was a continuation of his early investigations of cancer being a disease of acquired mutations. His interest in cancer stem cells was strongly influenced by evidence that in addition to genomic mutations, epigenetic modification of a cell may contribute to the development or progression of cancer.

=== Nobel Prize ===
Dulbecco and his group demonstrated that the infection of normal cells with certain types of viruses (oncoviruses) led to the incorporation of virus-derived genes into the host-cell genome, and that this event lead to the transformation (the acquisition of a tumor phenotype) of those cells. As demonstrated by Temin and Baltimore, who shared the Nobel Prize with Dulbecco, the transfer of viral genes to the cell is mediated by an enzyme called reverse transcriptase (or, more precisely, RNA-dependent DNA polymerase), which replicates the viral genome (in this case made of RNA) into DNA, which is later incorporated in the host genome.

Oncoviruses are the cause of some forms of human cancers. Dulbecco's study gave a basis for a precise understanding of the molecular mechanisms by which they propagate, thus allowing humans to better fight them. Furthermore, the mechanisms of carcinogenesis mediated by oncoviruses closely resemble the process by which normal cells degenerate into cancer cells. Dulbecco's discoveries allowed humans to better understand and fight cancer. In addition, it is well known that in the 1980s and 1990s, an understanding of reverse transcriptase and of the origins, nature, and properties of human immunodeficiency virus (HIV, of which there are two well-understood serotypes, HIV-1, and the less-common and less virulent HIV-2), the virus which, if unchecked, ultimately causes acquired immunodeficiency syndrome (AIDS), led to the development of the first group of drugs that could be considered successful against the virus, the reverse-transcriptase inhibitors, of which zidovudine is a well-known example. These drugs are still used today as one part of the highly-active antiretroviral therapy drug cocktail that is in contemporary use.

=== Other awards ===
In 1965 he received the Marjory Stephenson Prize from the Society for General Microbiology. That same year, he was elected to the American Academy of Arts and Sciences. In 1973 he was awarded the Louisa Gross Horwitz Prize from Columbia University together with Theodore Puck and Harry Eagle. Dulbecco was the recipient of the Selman A. Waksman Award in Microbiology from the National Academy of Sciences in 1974. He was elected a Foreign Member of the Royal Society (ForMemRS) in 1974. In 1993, he was elected to the American Philosophical Society.
